= List of countries by total health expenditure per capita =

Yearly healthcare expenditure per person (total public and private)

This article includes 2 lists of countries of the world and their total expenditure on health per capita. Total expenditure includes both public and private expenditures. See also: Health spending as percent of gross domestic product (GDP) by country.

The first table uses OECD data and lists member countries of the Organisation for Economic Co-operation and Development (OECD), and a few other countries. It shows each country's total spending (public and private) on health per capita in PPP international dollars.

The next data table (Table 2) lists nearly all countries. It uses data from the World Health Organization (WHO). It also shows each country's total spending (public and private) on health per capita in PPP international dollars.

== Organization for Economic Co-operation and Development ==
A country list from OECD Data at Organisation for Economic Co-operation and Development.

=== Table 1 ===
Area links below are "Healthcare in Area" links.

OECD countries and others. Total health spending per capita in PPP international dollars. Not inflation-adjusted.
Area	2024	2023	2022	2021	2020
Argentina	..	3,234	3,214	3,010	2,478
Australia	7,469	7,015	6,907	6,546	5,819
Austria	8,401	7,697	7,700	7,465	6,295
Belgium	7,750	7,178	6,906	6,554	6,097
Brazil	..	..	1,898	1,778	1,578
Bulgaria	..	2,860	2,602	2,446	2,392
Canada	7,301	7,046	6,876	6,906	6,209
Chile	3,749	3,396	3,113	2,848	2,489
China	..	..	1,223	1,110	1,030
Colombia	1,877	1,584	1,376	1,379	1,379
Costa Rica	1,935	1,752	1,661	1,647	1,581
Croatia	..	2,815	2,615	2,531	2,315
Cyprus	..	4,156	4,108	3,852	3,490
Czech Republic	5,014	4,595	4,394	4,462	4,098
Denmark	7,071	6,555	6,661	6,913	6,147
Estonia	3,768	3,369	3,169	3,176	2,922
Finland	6,655	6,276	5,765	5,395	4,967
France	7,367	6,848	6,701	6,395	5,874
Germany	9,365	8,503	8,652	8,103	7,364
Greece	3,607	3,442	3,176	2,930	2,654
Hungary	3,303	3,023	3,013	2,950	2,615
Iceland	6,770	6,134	5,956	5,556	5,010
India	..	..	334	297	250
Indonesia	..	417	386	476	402
Ireland	7,813	7,027	6,748	6,221	5,619
Israel	4,352	3,840	3,703	3,477	3,015
Italy	5,164	4,847	4,744	4,409	4,027
Japan	5,790	5,619	5,984	5,438	4,856
Korea	4,797	4,586	4,634	4,106	3,618
Latvia	3,411	2,705	2,864	3,096	2,403
Lithuania	4,259	3,331	3,242	3,146	3,092
Luxembourg	8,087	7,173	6,854	6,432	5,859
Malta	..	5,251	5,026	4,831	4,653
Mexico	1,588	1,494	1,394	1,272	1,203
Netherlands	8,436	7,615	7,517	7,317	6,516
New Zealand	6,097	6,014	6,145	4,869	4,353
Norway	9,393	8,909	8,533	7,890	7,221
Peru	..	959	1,017	1,020	817
Poland	4,284	3,519	3,133	2,752	2,510
Portugal	5,212	4,713	4,594	4,208	3,555
Romania	..	2,312	2,123	2,108	2,218
Slovakia	4,021	3,280	3,126	2,922	2,449
Slovenia	5,527	4,556	4,353	3,894	3,756
South Africa	..	..	1,345	1,236	1,193
Spain	5,346	4,927	4,744	4,405	3,996
Sweden	7,871	7,364	6,977	6,617	6,069
Switzerland	9,963	9,301	9,089	8,392	7,621
Thailand	..	1,102	1,230	1,077	862
Turkey	2,309	2,103	1,654	1,588	1,382
Ukraine	..	..	..	1,512	1,161
United Kingdom	6,747	6,412	6,188	5,785	5,381
United States	14,885	13,818	12,898	12,375	11,926

== OECD bar charts, and graphs ==
Average annual health expenditures per person in US dollars (PPP). For OECD countries, and some other countries.

- "Government/compulsory": government health schemes or compulsory insurance (public or private).
- "Voluntary/Out of pocket": private voluntary health insurance or direct payments by households.

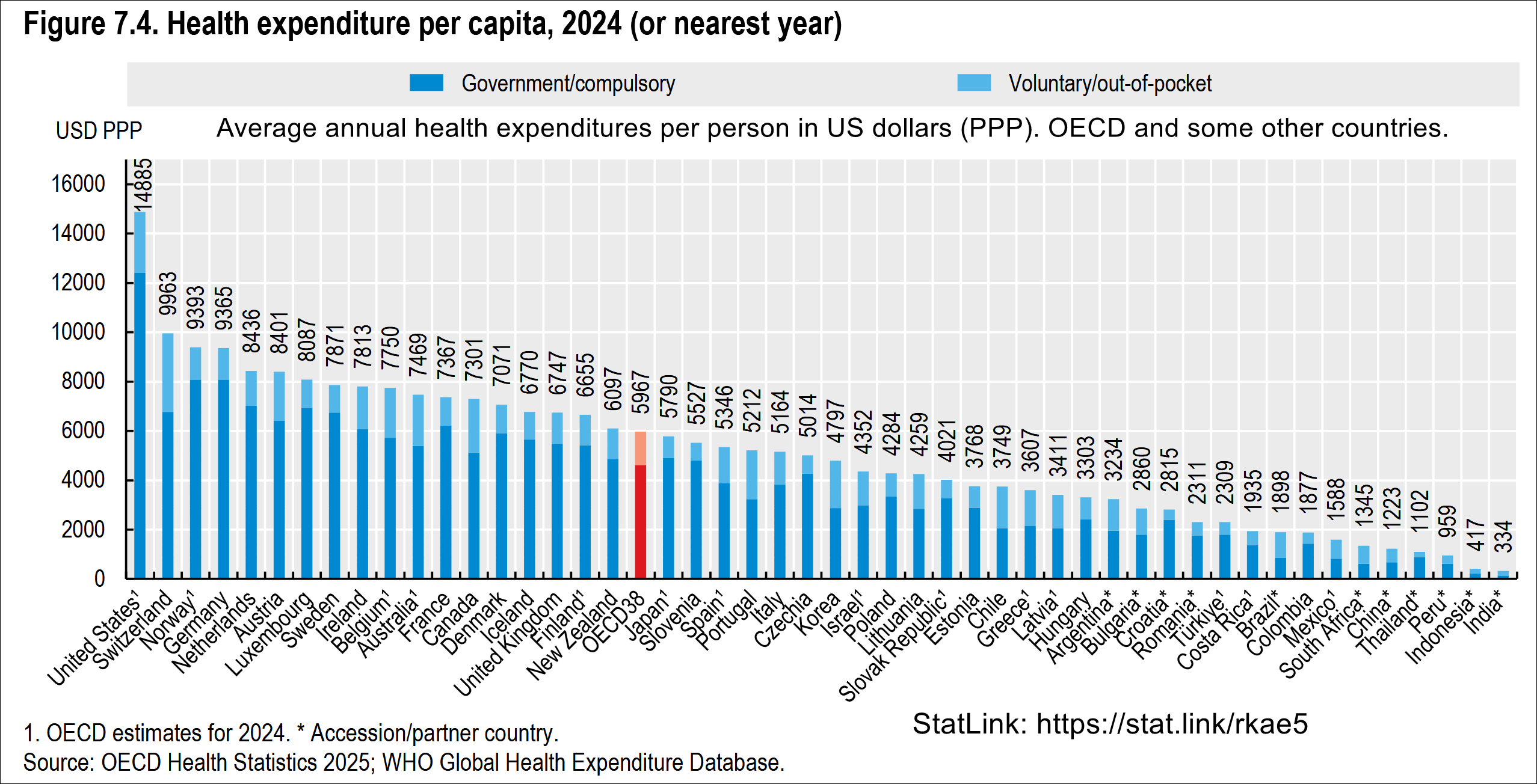
Click to enlarge.

The chart below is older (2020 data) and breaks down the voluntary spending further by separating out-of-pocket payments. In this chart the items are stacked by color. There are a few other countries than just OECD countries.

Click to enlarge.

Timeline of a few OECD countries:

Health care cost as percent of GDP (total economy of a nation)

Charts below are life expectancy versus healthcare spending of rich OECD countries. US average of $10,447 in 2018, and $14,775 in 2024. See: list of countries by life expectancy.

Life expectancy

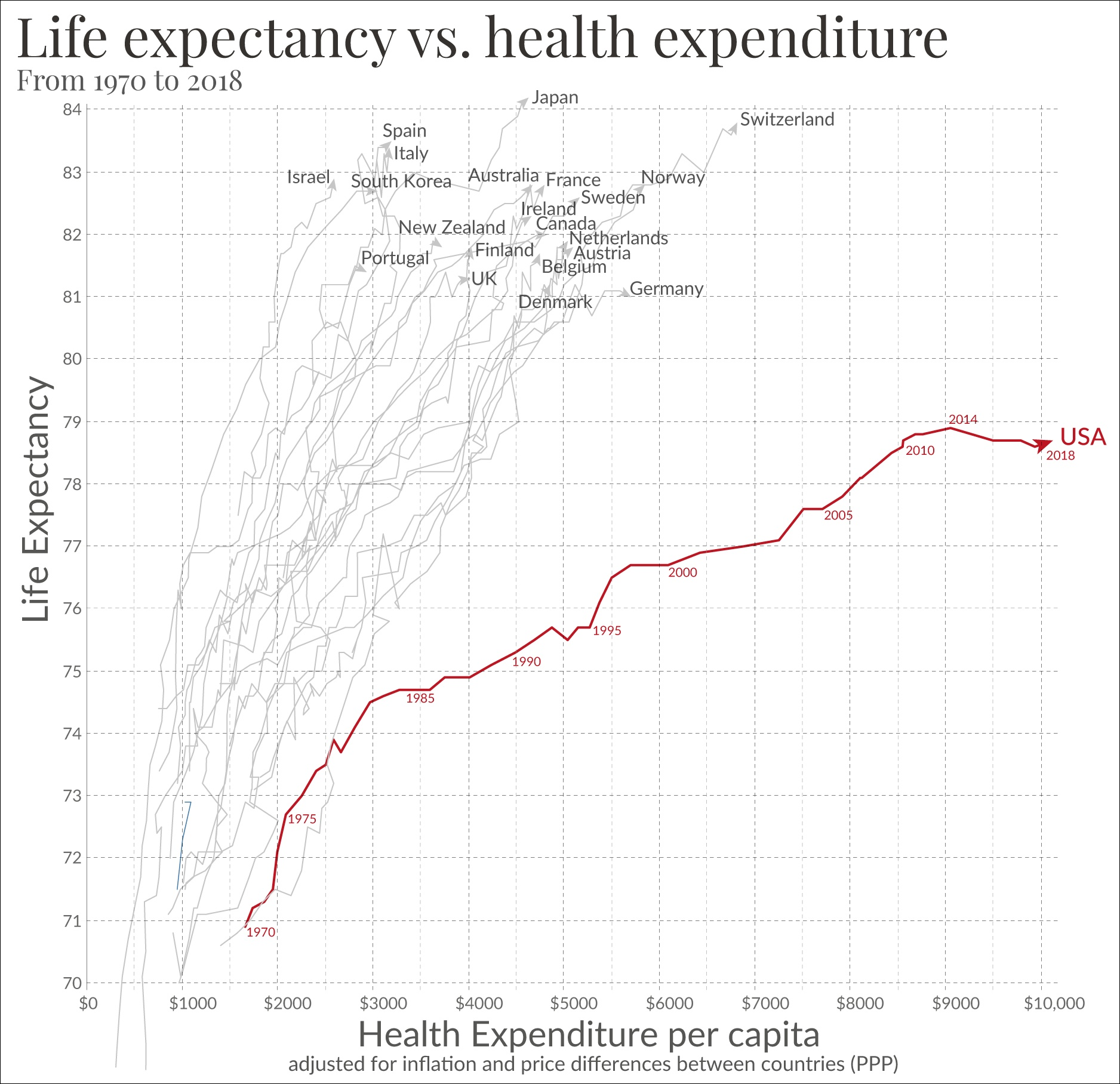
US average of $10,447 in 2018.

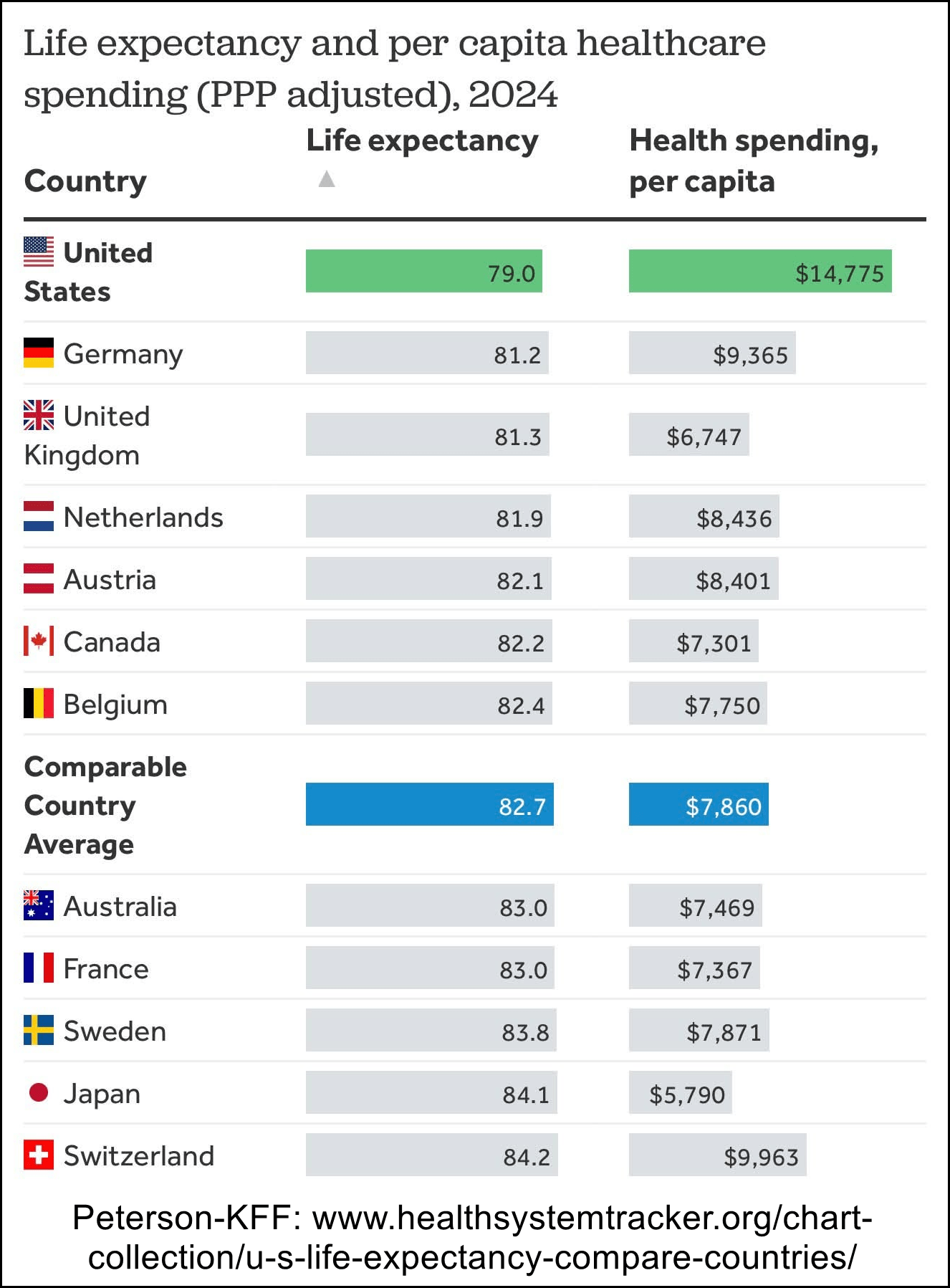
US life expectancy and per capita healthcare spending compared to other wealthy countries (mainly Europe). From Peterson-KFF Health System Tracker.

== World Health Organization ==
A country list from World Health Organization's Global Health Expenditure Database. Processed by Our World in Data.

=== Table 2 ===
Location links below are "Healthcare in LOCATION" links.

Total health spending per capita in PPP international dollars $. Not inflation-adjusted.
Location	PPP $	Year
Afghanistan	383	2022
Albania	1,186	2022
Algeria	547	2022
Andorra	5,641	2023
Angola	217	2022
Antigua and Barbuda	1,436	2022
Argentina	2,664	2022
Armenia	1,824	2022
Australia	7,072	2022
Austria	7,891	2023
Azerbaijan	699	2022
Bahamas	3,047	2022
Bahrain	2,257	2022
Bangladesh	179	2022
Barbados	1,172	2022
Belarus	1,511	2022
Belgium	7,388	2022
Belize	477	2022
Benin	106	2022
Bhutan	600	2022
Bolivia	831	2022
Bosnia and Herzegovina	1,827	2022
Botswana	1,132	2022
Brazil	1,696	2022
Brunei	1,242	2022
Bulgaria	2,570	2022
Burkina Faso	174	2022
Burundi	68	2022
Cambodia	333	2022
Cameroon	202	2022
Canada	6,813	2023
Cape Verde	664	2022
Central African Republic	109	2022
Chad	94	2022
Chile	3,287	2023
China	1,136	2022
Colombia	1,674	2023
Comoros	317	2022
Congo	83	2022
Costa Rica	1,917	2022
Ivory Coast	227	2022
Croatia	3,055	2022
Cuba	2,884	2022
Cyprus	4,813	2022
Czech Republic	4,476	2023
DR Congo	50	2022
Denmark	7,012	2023
Djibouti	154	2022
Dominica	931	2022
Dominican Republic	1,044	2022
Timor-Leste	341	2022
Ecuador	989	2022
Egypt	700	2022
El Salvador	1,085	2022
Equatorial Guinea	466	2022
Eritrea	87	2022
Estonia	3,409	2022
Eswatini	762	2022
Ethiopia	79	2022
Fiji	590	2023
Finland	6,048	2022
France	6,853	2022
Gabon	461	2022
Gambia	89	2022
Georgia	1,456	2022
Germany	7,758	2023
Ghana	242	2022
Greece	3,298	2022
Grenada	919	2022
Guatemala	783	2022
Guinea	116	2022
Guinea-Bissau	187	2022
Guyana	1,229	2022
Haiti	107	2022
Honduras	557	2022
Hungary	2,770	2023
Iceland	6,475	2023
India	273	2022
Indonesia	390	2022
Iran	966	2022
Iraq	466	2022
Ireland	8,298	2022
Israel	4,009	2022
Italy	4,935	2023
Jamaica	925	2022
Japan	5,387	2022
Jordan	767	2022
Kazakhstan	1,129	2022
Kenya	248	2022
Kiribati	303	2022
Kuwait	2,415	2022
Kyrgyzstan	311	2022
Laos	189	2022
Latvia	3,139	2022
Lebanon	653	2022
Lesotho	365	2022
Liberia	224	2022
Libya	969	2022
Lithuania	3,523	2023
Luxembourg	8,175	2023
Madagascar	56	2022
Malawi	105	2022
Malaysia	1,281	2022
Maldives	2,454	2022
Mali	90	2022
Malta	5,760	2022
Marshall Islands	747	2022
Mauritania	274	2022
Mauritius	1,554	2022
Mexico	1,353	2022
Federated States of Micronesia	378	2022
Moldova	1,095	2022
Monaco	8,765	2022
Mongolia	1,267	2022
Montenegro	3,107	2022
Morocco	553	2022
Mozambique	131	2022
Myanmar	242	2022
Namibia	930	2022
Nauru	2,576	2022
Nepal	323	2022
Netherlands	7,576	2022
New Zealand	5,214	2022
Nicaragua	636	2022
Niger	68	2022
Nigeria	245	2022
North Macedonia	1,815	2022
Norway	9,927	2022
Oman	1,178	2022
Pakistan	179	2022
Palau	1,979	2022
Palestine	625	2022
Panama	3,332	2022
Papua New Guinea	115	2022
Paraguay	1,247	2022
Peru	942	2022
Philippines	569	2023
Poland	3,402	2023
Portugal	4,452	2023
Qatar	2,318	2022
Romania	2,472	2022
Russia	2,446	2022
Rwanda	222	2022
Saint Kitts and Nevis	1,946	2022
Saint Lucia	883	2022
Saint Vincent and the Grenadines	820	2022
Samoa	396	2022
San Marino	5,880	2022
São Tomé and Príncipe	304	2022
Saudi Arabia	3,102	2022
Senegal	168	2022
Serbia	2,373	2022
Seychelles	1,561	2022
Sierra Leone	160	2022
Singapore	6,658	2022
Slovakia	3,169	2022
Slovenia	5,035	2023
Solomon Islands	116	2022
Somalia	44	2022
South Africa	1,341	2022
South Korea	5,350	2023
South Sudan	39	2022
Spain	4,776	2022
Sri Lanka	611	2022
Sudan	122	2022
Suriname	1,043	2022
Sweden	7,659	2023
Switzerland	10,668	2022
Syria	454	2022
Tajikistan	364	2022
Tanzania	93	2022
Thailand	1,107	2022
Togo	149	2022
Tonga	520	2021
Trinidad and Tobago	1,811	2022
Tunisia	885	2022
Turkey	1,387	2022
Turkmenistan	873	2022
Tuvalu	1,127	2022
Uganda	127	2022
Ukraine	1,095	2021
United Arab Emirates	3,814	2022
United Kingdom	6,372	2023
United States	12,434	2022
Uruguay	2,568	2022
Uzbekistan	716	2022
Vanuatu	138	2022
Venezuela	131	2022
Vietnam	611	2022
Yemen	109	2022
Zambia	208	2022
Zimbabwe	96	2022

== See also ==
- Health economics
- Health system
- Health care systems by country
- List of countries by hospital beds
- List of countries by infant and under-five mortality rate
- List of countries by maternal mortality ratio
- List of countries by total health expenditure by type of financing
- Health spending as percent of gross domestic product (GDP) by country
