= Lists of hospitals in Europe =

Map of contemporary Europe

The following are lists of hospitals for each country in Europe:

== Sovereign states ==
Hospitals in European sovereign states
Country	List	Category	Number of articles in category
Albania	List of hospitals in Albania	Category:Hospitals in Albania	6
Andorra	The only hospital in Andorra is the Nostra Senyora de Meritxell Hospital	Category:Hospitals in Andorra	1
Armenia	List of hospitals in Armenia	Category:Hospitals in Armenia	2
Austria	List of hospitals in Austria	Category:Hospitals in Austria	9
Azerbaijan	List of hospitals in Azerbaijan	Category:Hospitals in Azerbaijan	3
Belarus	List of hospitals in Belarus	Category:Hospitals in Belarus	3
Belgium	List of hospitals in Belgium	Category:Hospitals in Belgium	0
Bosnia and Herzegovina	List of hospitals in Bosnia and Herzegovina	Category:Hospitals in Bosnia and Herzegovina	6
Bulgaria	List of hospitals in Bulgaria	Category:Hospitals in Bulgaria	4
Croatia	List of hospitals in Croatia	Category:Hospitals in Croatia	6
Cyprus	List of hospitals in Cyprus	Category:Hospitals in Cyprus	6
Czech Republic	List of hospitals in the Czech Republic	Category:Hospitals in the Czech Republic	4
Denmark	List of hospitals in Denmark	Category:Hospitals in Denmark	26
Estonia	List of hospitals in Estonia	Category:Hospitals in Estonia	13
Finland	List of hospitals in Finland	Category:Hospitals in Finland	18
France	List of hospitals in France	Category:Hospitals in France	19
Georgia (country)	List of hospitals in Georgia (country)	Category:Hospitals in Georgia (country)	3
Germany	List of hospitals in Germany	Category:Hospitals in Germany	31
Greece	List of hospitals in Greece	Category:Hospitals in Greece	7
Hungary	List of hospitals in Hungary	Category:Hospitals in Hungary	5
Iceland	List of hospitals in Iceland	Category:Hospitals in Iceland	4
Ireland	List of hospitals in Ireland	Category:Hospitals in Ireland	9
Italy	List of hospitals in Italy	Category:Hospitals in Italy	19
Kazakhstan	List of hospitals in Kazakhstan	Category:Hospitals in Kazakhstan	1
Latvia	List of hospitals in Latvia	Category:Hospitals in Latvia	4
Liechtenstein	Liechtenstein has one hospital, the National Hospital, situated in the capital, Vaduz,	Category:Hospitals in Liechtenstein	0
Lithuania	List of hospitals in Lithuania	Category:Hospitals in Lithuania	6
Luxembourg	List of hospitals in Luxembourg	Category:Hospitals in Luxembourg	4
Malta	List of hospitals in Malta	Category:Hospitals in Malta	6
Moldova	List of hospitals in Moldova	Category:Hospitals in Moldova	1
Monaco	There are three public hospitals: Princess Grace Hospital Centre, the Cardiothoracic Center of Monaco and the Haemodialysis Centre.	Category:Hospitals in Monaco	2
Montenegro	List of hospitals in Montenegro	Category:Hospitals in Montenegro	1
Netherlands	List of hospitals in the Netherlands	Category:Hospitals in the Netherlands	13
North Macedonia	List of hospitals in North Macedonia	Category:Hospitals in North Macedonia	3
Norway	List of hospitals in Norway	Category:Hospitals in Norway	23
Poland	List of hospitals in Poland	Category:Hospitals in Poland	19
Portugal	List of hospitals in Portugal	Category:Hospitals in Portugal	12
Romania	List of hospitals in Romania	Category:Hospitals in Romania	13
Russia	List of hospitals in Russia	Category:Hospitals in Russia	14
San Marino	List of hospitals in San Marino	Category:Hospitals in San Marino	0
Serbia	List of hospitals in Serbia	Category:Hospitals in Serbia	12
Slovakia	List of hospitals in Slovakia	Category:Hospitals in Slovakia	5
Slovenia	List of hospitals in Slovenia	Category:Hospitals in Slovenia	6
Spain	List of hospitals in Spain	Category:Hospitals in Spain	24
Sweden	List of hospitals in Sweden	Category:Hospitals in Sweden	22
Switzerland	List of hospitals in Switzerland	Category:Hospitals in Switzerland	16
Turkey	List of hospitals in Turkey	Category:Hospitals in Turkey	10
Ukraine	List of hospitals in Ukraine	Category:Hospitals in Ukraine	8
United Kingdom	List of hospitals in the United Kingdom	Category:Hospitals in the United Kingdom	36
UK: England	List of hospitals in England	Category:Hospitals in England	14, 320 (NHS), 274 (Defunct), 57 (Psychiatric)
UK: Northern Ireland	List of hospitals in Northern Ireland	Category:Hospitals in Northern Ireland	7
UK: Scotland	List of hospitals in Scotland	Category:Hospitals in Scotland	43
UK: Wales	List of hospitals in Wales	Category:Hospitals in Wales	29
Vatican City	There are no hospitals in the Vatican City. There is a department that deals with health. There are numerous hospitals in the surrounding city of Rome, Italy. The Gemelli Hospital in Rome always keeps a room available for the Pope, and has treated many Vatican and Curial officials.		

== States with limited recognition ==
- Abkhazia, List of hospitals in Abkhazia
- Artsakh, List of hospitals in the Republic of Artsakh
- Kosovo, List of hospitals in Kosovo, Category:Hospitals in Kosovo, 2
- Northern Cyprus, List of hospitals in Northern Cyprus, 2
- South Ossetia, List of hospitals in South Ossetia
- Transnistria, List of hospitals in Transnistria

== Dependencies and other entities ==
- Åland: Ålands Hälso och sjukvård (ÅHS) is in charge of public health care in Åland. It offers medical care to both the local population and visitors. This includes everything from preventive care to specialized hospital care.
- Faroe Islands: There are three hospitals in the Faroe Islands-The National Hospital of the Faroe Islands in Tórshavn, The hospital in Klaksvík, and The hospital in Suðuroy.
- Gibraltar: Gibraltar has the St Bernard's Hospital, a 210-bed facility that opened in 2005. Psychiatric care is provided by King George V Hospital.
- Guernsey: Princess Elizabeth Hospital is the only acute care facility in Guernsey. Secondary care is provided through the Medical Specialist Group
- Isle of Man: There are two hospitals on the island, the main one being Noble's Hospital, with 314 beds, giving about four beds per 1,000 residents, around the European average, but considerably higher than in the UK. The much smaller Ramsey Cottage Hospital has 31 beds and is situated in the town of Ramsey, on the north of the island. Tertiary services are provided by the English NHS.
- Jersey: See Category:Hospitals in Jersey; In addition to the Jersey General Hospital in St Helier, The Enid Quenault Health and Wellbeing Centre is an outpatient facility in St Brelade, and Clinique Pinel at St Saviour's Hospital, St Saviour provides mental health services.
- Svalbard: There is a hospital in Longyearbyen, the largest settlement on the archipelago.
- The island's primary medical facility is the Princess Elizabeth Hospital (PEH) in Saint Martin, which serves as the sole acute hospital and has a capacity of approximately 104 beds.

== See also ==
- European hospital (disambiguation)
- Lists of hospitals in Asia
- Lists of hospitals in Africa
- Lists of hospitals in North America
- Lists of hospitals in Oceania
- Lists of hospitals in South America
