= Lists of hospitals in Asia =

The following are lists of hospitals for each country in Asia:

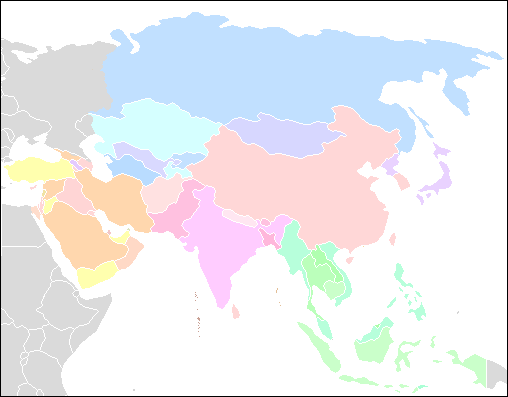

== Sovereign states ==
The following is a list of lists of hospitals in countries in Asia. A link to the category for hospitals in a country and number of hospital articles and sub-categories are shown, also.

- List of hospitals in Afghanistan (10)
- List of hospitals in Armenia (2)
- List of hospitals in Azerbaijan (3)
- List of hospitals in Bahrain (10)
- List of hospitals in Bangladesh (57)
- List of hospitals in Bhutan (1)
- List of hospitals in Brunei (6)
- List of hospitals in China (17)
- List of hospitals in Cambodia (6)
- List of hospitals in Cyprus (6)
- List of hospitals in East Timor (0)
- List of hospitals in Egypt (7)
- List of hospitals in Georgia (country) (3)
- List of hospitals in India (30)
- List of hospitals in Indonesia (15)
- List of hospitals in Iran (13)
- List of hospitals in Iraq (6)
- List of hospitals in Israel (37)
- List of hospitals in Japan (29)
- List of hospitals in Jordan (4)
- List of hospitals in Kazakhstan (1)
- List of hospitals in Kuwait (6)
- List of hospitals in Kyrgyzstan (0)
- List of hospitals in Laos (1)
- List of hospitals in Lebanon (16)
- List of hospitals in Macau (4)
- List of hospitals in Malaysia (17)
- List of hospitals in Maldives (5)
- List of hospitals in Mongolia (6)
- List of hospitals in Myanmar (5)
- List of hospitals in Nepal (29)
- List of hospitals in North Korea (4)
- List of hospitals in Pakistan (25)
- List of hospitals in Palestine (17)
- List of hospitals in the Philippines (90)
- List of hospitals in Oman (3)
- List of hospitals in Qatar (3)
- List of hospitals in Russia (14)
- List of hospitals in Saudi Arabia (16)
- List of hospitals in Singapore (49)
- List of hospitals in South Korea (8)
- List of hospitals in Sri Lanka (9)
- List of hospitals in Syria (7)
- List of hospitals in Tajikistan
- List of hospitals in Thailand (29)
- List of hospitals in Turkey (10)
- List of hospitals in Turkmenistan (1)
- List of hospitals in the United Arab Emirates (15)
- List of hospitals in Uzbekistan (0)
- List of hospitals in Vietnam (12)
- List of hospitals in Yemen (6)

== States with limited recognition ==
- Abkhazia, List of hospitals in Abkhazia (0)
- Northern Cyprus, List of hospitals in Northern Cyprus (2)
- South Ossetia, List of hospitals in South Ossetia (0)
- Taiwan, List of hospitals in Taiwan (12)

== Dependencies and other territories ==
- British Indian Ocean Territory, The population is only British and American military. There are no hospitals. The U.S. Navy runs a Branch Health Clinic on Diego Garcia.
- List of Hospitals in Christmas Island (Christmas Island has one hospital: Christmas Island Hospital. See Lists of hospitals in Oceania#Christmas Island.
- List of hospitals in Cocos (Keeling) Islands. It has no hospitals. See Healthcare in Cocos (Keeling) Islands for more details.
- List of hospitals in Hong Kong
- List of hospitals in Macau

== See also ==
- Lists of hospitals in Africa
- Lists of hospitals in Europe
- Lists of hospitals in North America
- Lists of hospitals in Oceania
- Lists of hospitals in South America
