= Lists of hospitals in South America =

The following are lists of hospitals in South America. Entries contains links to the lists, number of articles in the category, and healthcare in each country, territory and dependency in South America.

== Sovereign states ==
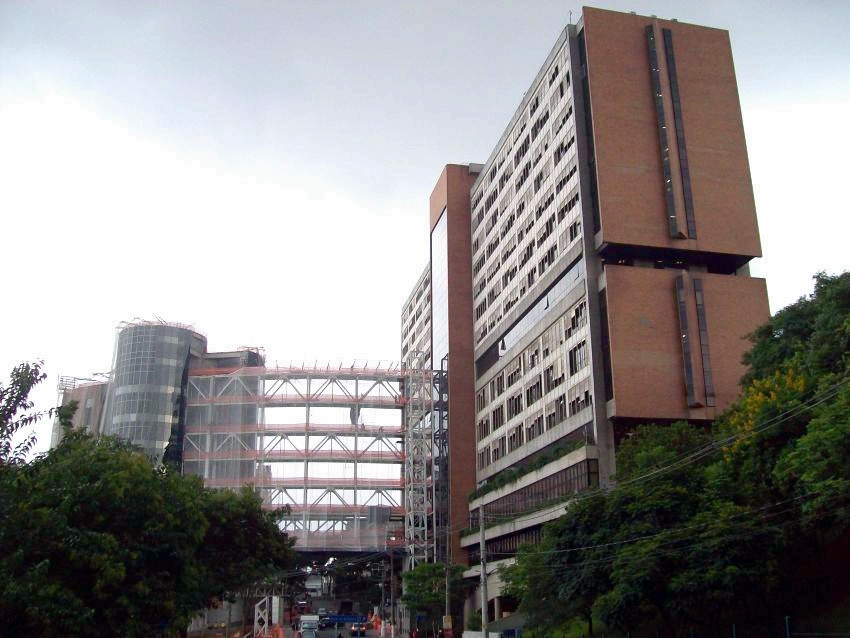
Albert Einstein Israelite Hospital in São Paulo, Brazil

- List of hospitals in Argentina (Notable: 13), Healthcare in Argentina
- List of hospitals in Bolivia, Healthcare in Bolivia
- List of hospitals in Brazil (Notable: 11), Healthcare in Brazil
- List of hospitals in Chile (Notable: 6), Healthcare in Chile
- List of hospitals in Colombia (Notable: 3), Healthcare in Colombia
- List of hospitals in Ecuador (Notable: 2), Health in Ecuador
- List of hospitals in Guyana (Notable: 3), Health in Guyana#Health Infrastructure
- List of hospitals in Paraguay, Healthcare in Paraguay
- List of hospitals in Peru (Notable: 2), Healthcare in Peru
- List of hospitals in Suriname (Notable: 6), Health in Suriname#Healthcare
- List of hospitals in Uruguay (Notable: 3), Healthcare in Uruguay
- List of hospitals in Venezuela (Notable: 1), Healthcare in Venezuela

== Territories and dependencies ==
- Falkland Islands: One hospital, King Edward VII Memorial Hospital
- List of hospitals in French Guiana (Notable: 3), French Guiana: One full service hospital Andrée-Rosemon Hospital
- South Georgia and the South Sandwich Islands have no permanent population.

== See also ==
- Lists of hospitals in Africa
- Lists of hospitals in Asia
- Lists of hospitals in Europe
- Lists of hospitals in North America
- Lists of hospitals in Oceania
