= List of hospitals in Georgia =

List of hospitals in Georgia may refer to:

- List of hospitals in Georgia (country)
- List of hospitals in Georgia (U.S. state)
