= European hospital =

European hospital may refer to:

== Classes of hospitals ==
- A hospital in Europe, see List of hospitals in Europe
- A colonial hospital for Europeans and whites, part of the practise of racial segregation
- A hospital practising Western Medicine outside of the Western World
- A hospital constructed or funded or operated by European concerns

== Individual hospitals ==
- European Hospital (Lagos) (est. 1880s), Onikan, Lagos Island, Lagos, Nigeria; former name of the "Creek Hospital"; also called "Lagos European Hospital"
- European Hospital (Mombasa) (est. 1891), Mombasa, Kenya; former name of the "Mombasa Hospital"; also called "Mombasa European Hospital"
- European Hospital (Nairobi) (est. 1954), Nairobi, Kenya; former name of the "Nairobi Hospital"; also called "Nairobi European Hospital"
- Nairobi European Hospital (est. 1902), Nairobi, Kenya; predecessor to the Nairobi Hospital; also called "European Hospital"
- Mzuzu European Hospital (est. 1945), Mzuzu, Malawi; former name of the "Mzuzu Central Hospital"; also called "European Hospital"
- Ranchi European Lunatic Asylum (est. 1918), Kanke, Ranchi, Jharkhand, India; former name of the Central Institute of Psychiatry Ranchi; also called "Ranchi European Hospital", "European Hospital"
- Government European Hospital (est. 1912), Kampala, Uganda; also called "Kampala European Hospital", "European Hospital"
- Gaza European Hospital (est. 1989), Khan Younis, Gaza Strip, Palestine

== See also ==
- Category:Hospitals in Europe
- Non-European Hospital, Johannesburg, South Africa; former name of Johannesburg General Hospital
- Hôpital Européen Georges-Pompidou (French: Georges Pompidou European Hospital), Paris, France
- La Roseraie European Hospital of Paris, Aubervilliers, Seine-Saint-Denis, Île-de-France, France
- European (disambiguation)
- Hospital (disambiguation)
