= Lists of hospitals in the United States =

Hospitals in the United States

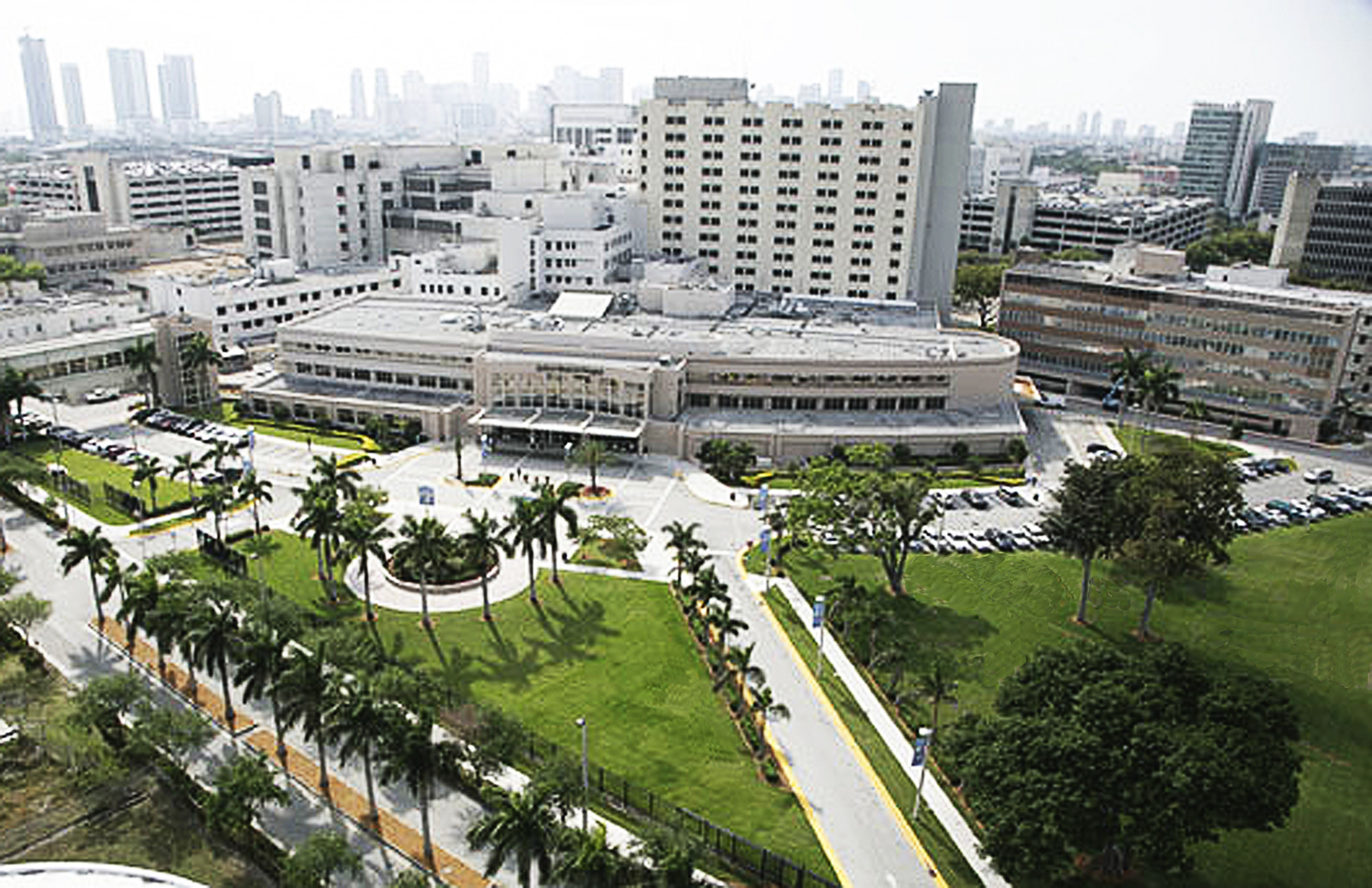
Jackson Memorial Hospital in Miami, the primary teaching hospital of the University of Miami's Miller School of Medicine and the largest hospital in the United States with 1,547 beds

This article contains links to lists of hospitals in the United States, including U.S. states, the national capital of Washington, D.C., insular areas, and outlying islands. Links to more detailed state lists are shown.

== U.S. states ==
As of 2020, there were 5,250 acute care and critical access hospitals in the United States. In the decade from 2010 to 2020, dozens of hospitals have closed in rural areas of the United States, particularly in the southeast. Of the 3,143 county-equivalents in the United States, there were 700 counties in the United States with no hospitals as of 2020. The following list contains links to the lists and the number of articles in the main category for each state. There may be additional psychiatric, county, and teaching hospitals not included in the main category.

- Alabama (10)
- Alaska (10)
- Arizona (28)
- Arkansas (9)
- California (41)
- Colorado (58)
- Connecticut (20)
- Delaware (8)
- Florida (102)
- Georgia (37)
- Hawaii (9)
- Idaho (6)
- Illinois (39)
- Indiana (42)
- Iowa (23)
- Kansas (29)
- Kentucky (20)
- Louisiana (12)
- Maine (11)
- Maryland (30)
- Massachusetts (19)
- Michigan (41)
- Minnesota (36)
- Mississippi (8)
- Missouri (24)
- Montana (11)
- Nebraska (10)
- Nevada (7)
- New Hampshire (14)
- New Jersey (65)
- New Mexico (10)
- New York (81)
- North Carolina (54)
- North Dakota (7)
- Ohio (49)
- Oklahoma (18)
- Oregon (48)
- Pennsylvania (61)
- Rhode Island (21)
- South Carolina (21)
- South Dakota (5)
- Tennessee (20)
- Texas (51)
- Utah (22)
- Vermont (17)
- Virginia (43)
- Washington (38)
- West Virginia (13)
- Wisconsin (22)
- Wyoming (7)
- Washington, D.C. (13)

== Insular areas ==
Lists or actual hospitals in insular areas of the United States include:

- List of hospitals in American Samoa (total: 1)
- List of hospitals in Guam (total: 3)
- List of hospitals in the Northern Mariana Islands (total: 1)
- List of hospitals in Puerto Rico (notable: 10)
- List of hospitals in the United States Virgin Islands (total: 2)

Freely associated states:

- List of hospitals in the Federated States of Micronesia (total: 5)
- List of hospitals in the Marshall Islands (total: 3)
- List of hospitals in Palau (total: 1)

== Outlying islands ==
Lists of hospitals in outlying islands of the United States include:

- Baker Island, none currently, uninhabited
- Howland Island, none currently, uninhabited
- Jarvis Island, none currently, uninhabited
- Johnston Atoll, none currently, underground hospital during World War II (1939–1941)
- Kingman Reef, none currently, uninhabited
- Midway Atoll, none currently
- Navassa Island, none currently, uninhabited
- Palmyra Atoll, none currently, unoccupied
- Wake Island, none currently, field hospitals during the Vietnam War to assist refugees

== See also ==
Lists of specific types of hospitals:

- List of burn centers in the United States
- List of children's hospitals in the United States
- List of public hospitals in the United States
- List of trauma centers in the United States
- List of sanatoria in the United States
- List of the oldest hospitals in the United States
- List of Veterans Affairs medical facilities
- List of Veterans Affairs medical facilities by state
- Combat support hospital
- List of United States Navy hospital ships

=== Lists of New York City hospitals ===
- List of hospitals in New York City
  - List of hospitals in the Bronx
  - List of hospitals in Brooklyn
  - List of hospitals in Manhattan
  - List of hospitals in Queens
  - List of hospitals on Staten Island
