= Healthcare in Georgia =

Healthcare in Georgia may refer to:

- Healthcare in Georgia (country)
- Healthcare in Georgia (U.S. state)
