= Lists of hospitals =

Lists of hospitals include the following. According to Cybermetrics Lab, they completed their rankings from over 16,500 hospitals worldwide in 2015.

== By continent ==
- Lists of hospitals in Africa
- Lists of hospitals in Asia
- Lists of hospitals in Europe
- Lists of hospitals in North America
- Lists of hospitals in Oceania
- Lists of hospitals in South America

== By size ==
- List of countries by hospital beds
- List of largest hospital campuses, a list of large hospitals ranked by bed capacity and staffing within a single campus
- List of largest hospital networks, a list of large hospitals ranked by bed capacity and staffing within a hospital network
- List of tallest hospitals

== See also ==
- List of countries by hospital beds
