= Port Vila Central Hospital =

Geography
- Location: Efate, Port Vila, Vanuatu
- Coordinates: 17.74227°S 168.321099°E

Organisation
- Type: District General

Services
- Emergency department: Yes
- Beds: 200

History
- Opened: 7 November 2014; 11 years ago

Links
- Lists: Hospitals in Vanuatu

Port Vila Central Hospital is a rural general hospital in Efate, Vanuatu, near the capital of Port Vila. Situated on a hillside overlooking the lagoon, it has over 200 beds and 6 full-time doctors, with four wards—medical, surgical, paediatric and maternity.

In 2014, the Japan International Cooperation Agency (JICA) through the Government of Japan handed over to the Government and people of Vanuatu a newly extended hospital building that consists of a General Out Patients (GOPD), Emergency Department, Laboratory Department, Radiology Department and a new theater.

In March 2015, Australian rescue teams were called in to remove of 100 kilograms of asbestos from the hospital after Vanuatu was struck by Tropical Cyclone Pam.
