= Liv Bona Dea Hospital =

- Medical Park

Geography
- Location: 2 Mehdi Abbasov, 1060, Baku, Azerbaijan
- Coordinates: 40.4126434°N 49.9305873°E

Organisation
- Care system: Private
- Type: Private hospital
- Patron: Taner Özbek (CEO)

Services
- Standards: JCI
- Emergency department: Yes
- Beds: 209

Helipads
- Helipad: Yes

History
- Founded: March 2018

Links
- Website: www.livhospital.com
- Lists: Hospitals in Azerbaijan

Liv Bona Dea Hospital opened on March 27th, 2018, in Baku, Azerbaijan. It consists of seven floors, with an area of 37,500 m². The opening ceremony was attended by the President of the Republic of Azerbaijan Ilham Aliyev and first lady Mehriban Aliyeva.
