= Ganja International Hospital =

Geography
- Location: Heydar. Aliyev avenue 60 D/E/F, Ganja, Azerbaijan

Organisation
- Care system: Private
- Type: Private hospital
- Patron: Ilyas Hasanov(CEO)

Services
- Standards: JCI
- Emergency department: Yes
- Beds: 73

History
- Founded: September 2015

Links
- Website: gbx.az/view.php?lang=en
- Lists: Hospitals in Azerbaijan

Ganja International Hospital opened in September, 2015 in Ganja, Azerbaijan. It consists of 5 floors, with an area of 11,887 m2.

== Facilities and services ==
Outpatient and stationary departments serve in the hospital. The polyclinic section consists of 25 cabinets, stationary sections (5 junior suites, 4 suites, and 2 VIP), 38 single beds, and 12 multi-bed patient rooms. There are 27 medical departments, and over 50 doctors work in the hospital. Every department of the hospital is supplied with modern equipment.

== Staff ==
There are more than 300 employees in the hospital. 55 of them are doctors. More than 150 open-heart operations have been done by Cardio vascular Surgeons in the Ganja International Hospital.

== Checkup center ==
There is a checkup center in Ganja International Hospital; every patient can check up generally or on one organ of the body.

== Emergency department ==
The hospital features 24-hour emergency services, including 2 ambulances and 1 reanimobile ready for transporting of patients and getting first aid.

== Infection Control ==
The Infection Control Commission controls regular acting medical services in the completed sterile conditions. 57 cameras were installed for the security of the hospital. Affable and experienced security personnel 24 hours. A water sprinkler fire suppression system, 8 emergency exits, and trained personnel minimized the risk of damage and loss of human life during the fire.
