= List of hospitals in Bolivia =

This is a list of hospitals in Bolivia. The following main hospitals are located in Bolivia:

- Centro Medico Foianini, Santa Cruz.
- Centro Medico Quirurgico Boliviano Belga, Cochabamba, private hospital.
- Clinica Angel Foianini, Santa Cruz, private hospital.
- Clinica Unifranz, La Paz, private hospital.
- Hospital La Portada, La Paz.
- Hospital Municipal Cotahuma, La Paz.
- Hospital San Vicente de Paul, Cochabamba.
- Hospital Urbari, Santa Cruz.
- Hospital Universitario Japonés, Santa Cruz.
