= List of hospitals in Kyrgyzstan =

List of hospitals in Kyrgyzstan shows the hospitals (Russian: больница; pronunciation: Bol'nitsa), their locations and links to articles on notable hospitals.

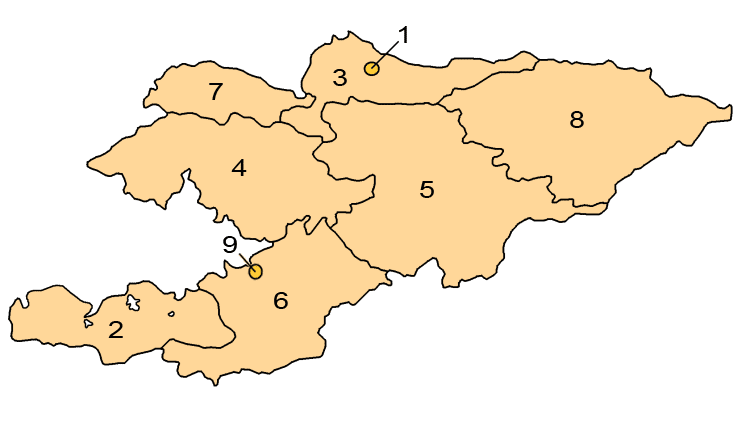
A clickable map of Kyrgyzstan exhibiting its provinces.

Most of the hospitals are located in the city of Biskek. The regions, and independent cities, are as follows:

1. City of Bişkek
2. Batken Region
3. Chuy Region
4. Jalal-Abad Region
5. Naryn Region
6. Osh Region
7. Talas
8. Issyk Kul Region
9. City of Osh

== Hospitals ==
Below are the known hospitals in Kyrgyzstan. There are also two psychiatric hospitals not listed.

Hospitals in Kyrgyzstan
| Hospital | Location | Comments, References |
|---|---|---|
| Ak-Suu Territorial Hospital | Issyk-Kul Region | |
| Aykor Medical Center | Bishkek | |
| Azmi Hospital | Bishkek; 42.883792°N 74.629818°E | also called Asian Medical Institute |
| Balykchy Territorial Hospital | Issyk-Kul Region; 42.498854°N 76.181317°E | |
| Bishkek City Trauma Unit | Bishkek | |
| Chuy Oblast Merged Hospital | Chuy Region | |
| Chuy-Tokmok Territorial Hospital | Chuy Region; 42.826505°N 75.280466°E | Russian: Чуйская районная территориальная больница |
| Cholpon-Ata Territorial Hospital | Issyk-Kul Region | |
| Eye Microsurgery Center | Bishkek | |
| Family Medicine Training Center No. 6 | Bishkek | (Eldik) |
| Health Center of the President of the Kyrgyz Republic | Bishkek | |
| Hospital Number 3 | Bishkek; 42.840263°N 74.606141°E | Russian: Городская Детская Клиническая Больница Скорой Медицинской Помощи, City Pediatric Clinical Emergency Hospital |
| Infectious Diseases Hospital | Bishkek; 42.863861°N 74.597218°E | also known as Republican Clinical Hospital, 400 beds |
| Issyk-Ata Territorial Hospital | Chuy Region | |
| Issyk Kul United Oblast Hospital, Karakol | Issyk-Kul Region, Krakol | |
| Jalal-Abad Regional Clinical Hospital | Jalal-Abad | associated with Jalal-Abad State University |
| Jeti - Oguz Territorial Hospital | Issyk-Kul Region | |
| Kamek Private Surgical Clinic | Bishkek; 42.871426°N 74.572613°E | |
| Kyrgyzstan Republic Hospital | Bishkek; 42.874362°N 74.599954°E | |
| Kyrghyez State Medical Center Academic Hospital | Bishkek; 42.842542°N 74.607248°E | affiliated with Kyrgyz State Medical Academy, I. K. Akhunbaev |
| Med Expert Clinic | Bishkek | |
| Medical Associates | Bishkek; 42.879793°N 74.612778°E | operates out of the Hyatt Regency |
| National Center of Cardiology and Internal Medicine Mirakhinov | Bishkek; 42.873919°N 74.595719°E | |
| NeoMed Diagnostic and Consulting Group | Bishkek; 42.873695°N 74.601728°E | |
| Osh Cardio Hospital | Osh; 40.748568°N 72.786472°E | |
| Republican Scientific-Research Centre for Trauma and Orthopaedics | Bishkek | |
| Ton Territorial Hospital | Issyk-Kul Region | |
| Tokmok City Hospital | Chuy Region | |
