= Lists of hospitals in Oceania =

Regions of Oceania

The following are lists of hospitals in Oceania, for each sovereign state, associated states of New Zealand, and dependencies, and territories. Links to lists of hospitals in countries are used when there are more than a few hospitals in the country. Oceania has an area of 8,525,989 km^{2} (3,291,903 sq mi) and population of 46,345,760 (2024). The World Health Organization surveys of healthcare in smaller countries are used to identify hospitals in smaller countries.

== Sovereign states ==
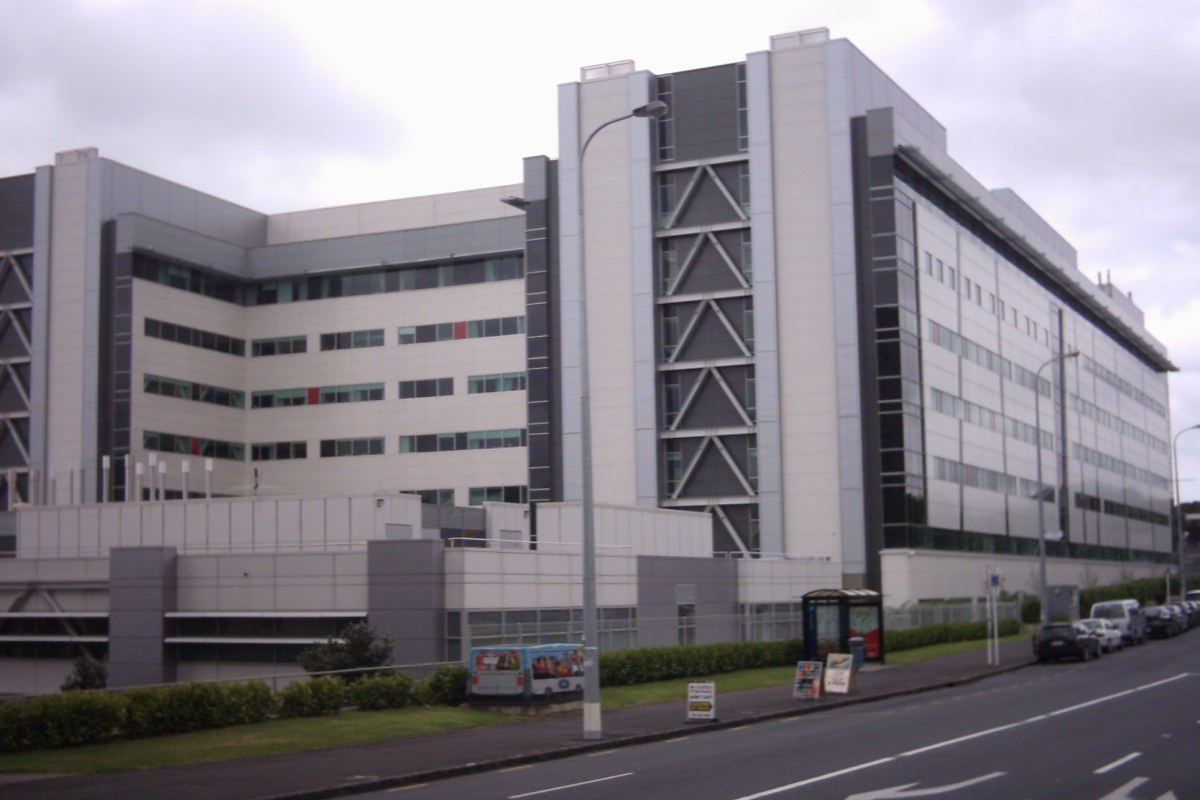
Auckland City Hospital, New Zealand, founded in 1846

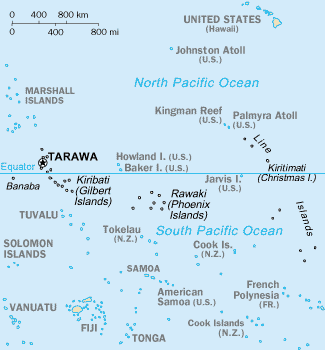

- Australia: See List of hospitals in Australia
- Federated States of Micronesia has four state hospitals and one private hospital.
  - Chuuk State Hospital in Weno in Chuuk State
  - Kosrae State Hospital in Tofol, Lelu municipality on Kosrae island in Kosrae state
  - Pohnpei State Hospital in Kolonia on Pohnpei in Pohnpei State
  - Yap State Hospital in Colonia on Yap in Yap State
  - Genesis Hospital, Pohnpei, a private 36-bed hospital
- Fiji: See List of hospitals in Fiji
- Kiribati: There are four hospitals in Kiribati:
  - Tungaru Central Hospital (central referral hospital), in Nawerewere, South Tarawa, 120 beds
  - Betio Hospital, Betio, 10 beds
  - London Hospital, Kiritimati, seven-beds, serves the Line and Phoenix Island groups
  - Southern Kiribati Hospital (SKH) services the Southern Gilbert Islands
- Marshall Islands
  - Leroj Atama Medical Center, Majuro Public Hospital, Delap Island, Majuro Atoll, 101 beds
  - Leroj Kitlang Health Center, Ebeye Hospital, Kwajalein Atoll, 45 beds
  - U.S. military hospital, Kwajalen Atoll
- Nauru has one hospital: Republic of Nauru Hospital, Yaren District
- New Zealand: See List of hospitals in New Zealand
- Palau has one hospital: Belau National Hospital, Koror
- Papua New Guinea: See List of hospitals in Papua New Guinea
- Samoa: There are several hospitals on the islands of Upolu and Savai'i in Samoa:
  - Tupua Tamases Meaole (TTM) Hospital at Motootua
  - Poutasi District Hospital at Poutasi, Upolu Island
  - Leulumoga District Hospital in Leulumoega, Upolu island
  - Sataua District Hospital, Sataua District, Savai'i island
  - Safotu District Hospital at Safotu, Savai'i island
- Solomon Islands: See List of hospitals in Solomon Islands
- Tonga currently has four hospitals.
  - Vaiola Hospital, located in Nukuʻalofa
  - Prince Wellington Ngu Hospital (District hospital) in Vavaʻu
  - Niu’ui Hospital (District hospital) in Haʻapai
  - Niu’eki Hospital (District hospital) in ʻEua
- Tuvalu has one hospital: Princess Margaret Hospital (Funafuti), Funafuti on Fongafale islet.
- Vanuatu has one hospital: Port Vila Central Hospital, serving Efate, Vanuatu, near the capital of Port Vila

== Part of or associated with a sovereign state ==
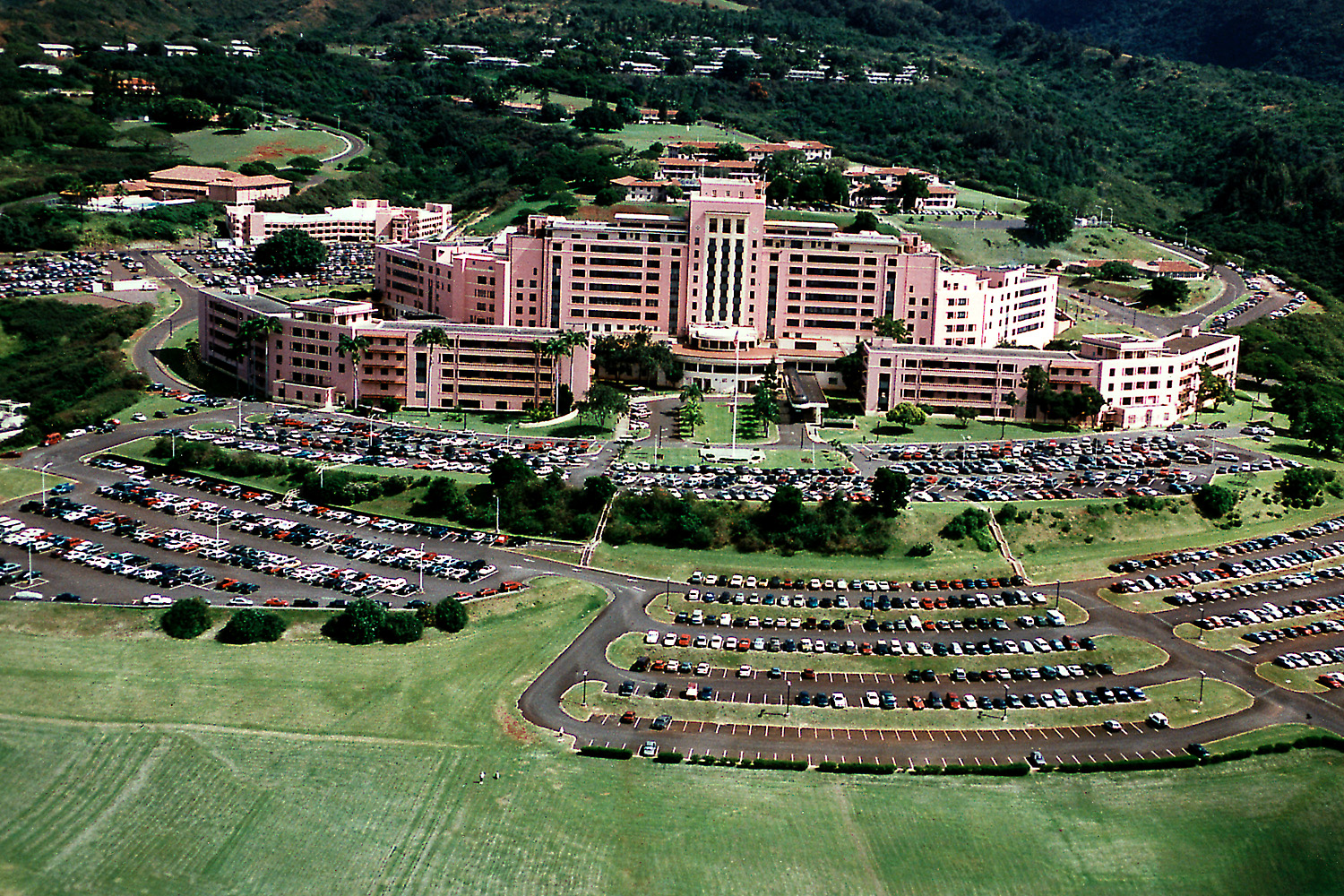
Tripler Army Medical Center, Hawaii

- Cook Islands (associated state with New Zealand)
- Hawaii (a U.S. state) has over 25 hospitals, including the largest military hospital in Oceania, Tripler Army Medical Center hospital. See List of hospitals in Hawaii
- Niue (associated state with New Zealand)

== Dependencies and territories ==
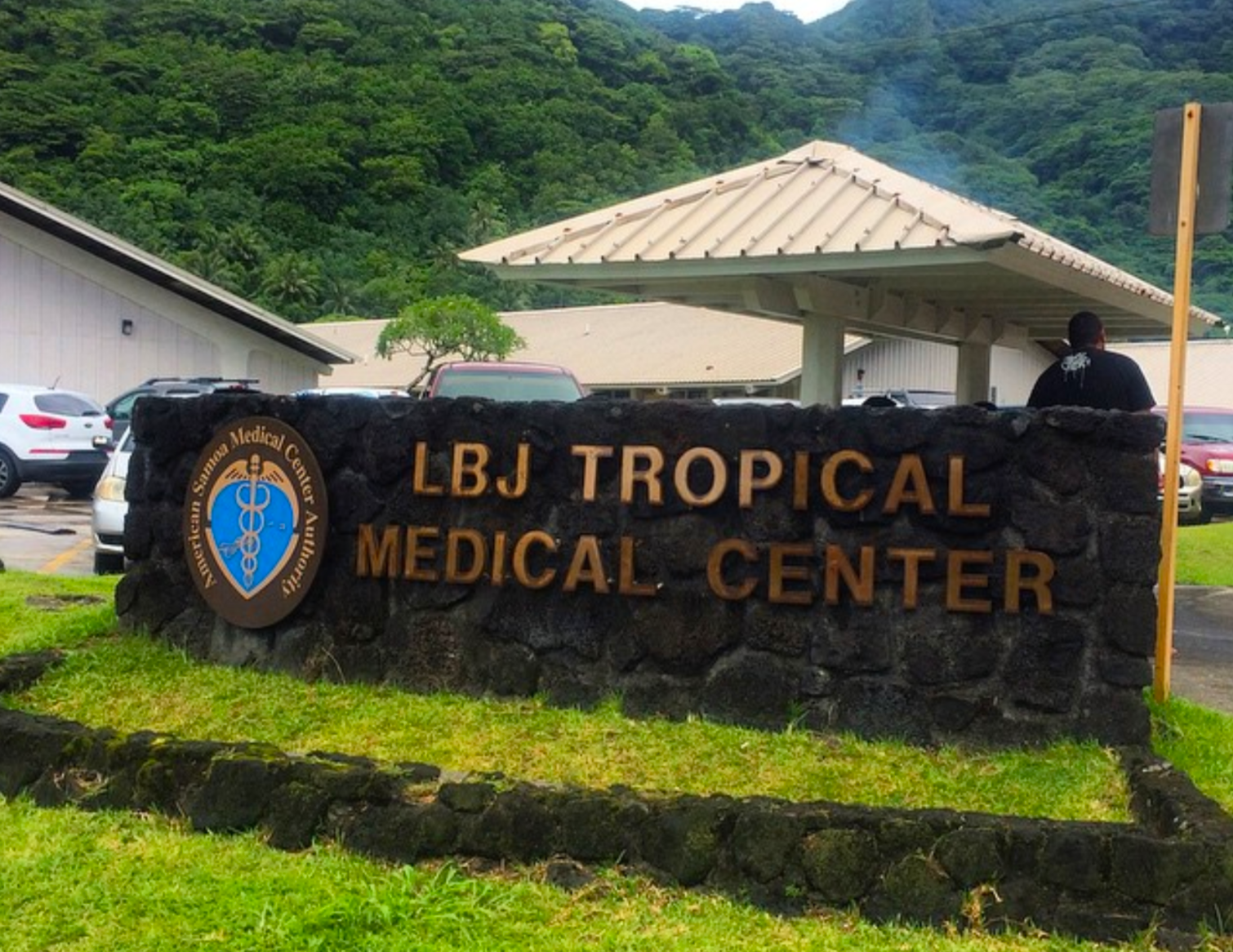
LBJ Tropical Medical Center, American Samoa

- American Samoa (an Unincorporated territory of the United States) has one hospital: LBJ Tropical Medical Center, Faga'alu, Maoputasi County
- Christmas Island (Australian External Territory) has one hospital: Christmas Island Hospital
- Cocos (Keeling) Islands (Australian external territory), no hospitals, see Healthcare in Cocos (Keeling) Islands for more details
- Easter Island (special territory of Chile), Easter Island has one public hospital, Hospital de Hanga Roa, which was established in 2012.
- French Polynesia (overseas collectivity of the French Republic).
- Guam (a U.S. Territory) has three hospitals including a U.S. Naval hospital.
  - Guam Memorial Hospital, Oka Tamuning, 201 beds
  - Guam Regional Medical City, Dededo, 105 beds
  - United States Naval Hospital Guam, Agana Heights
- New Caledonia (part of Overseas France): Since 2018, New Caledonia has had five public and three private hospitals. See Health in New Caledonia, French Wikipedia
- Norfolk Island (External territory of Australia): Norfolk Island has one hospital, the Norfolk Island Hospital
- Northern Mariana Islands (insular area and commonwealth of the United States) currently has one active hospital. Japan had two hospitals in the islands during World War II.
  - Japanese Hospital (Saipan), during World War II
  - Japanese Hospital (Rota), during World War II
  - Commonwealth Health Center, Saipan, 74 beds
- Pitcairn Islands (British Overseas Territory), With a population of 50 in 2020, there are no hospitals on Pitcairn Islands.
- Tokelau (Dependent territory of New Zealand): Tokelau has hospitals on each of its atolls: Atafu, Nukunonu, and Fakaofo. See also Health care in Tokelau
- Wallis and Futuna: Health care is available without charge in two hospitals on Uvea and Futuna islands. See also Wallis and Futuna#Healthcare

== History ==
During wartime and refugee situations, there have been U.S. hospitals on outlying islands, including Wake Island and Johnston Atoll. The Japanese had hospitals on Saipan and Rota islands during World War II.

== See also ==
- Lists of hospitals in Africa
- Lists of hospitals in Asia
- Lists of hospitals in Europe
- Lists of hospitals in North America
- Lists of hospitals in South America
