= Creek Hospital =

Hospital in Onikan, Lagos, Nigeria

Geography
- Location: Lagos, Lagos, Nigeria

Organisation
- Care system: NHS

Links
- Lists: Hospitals in Nigeria

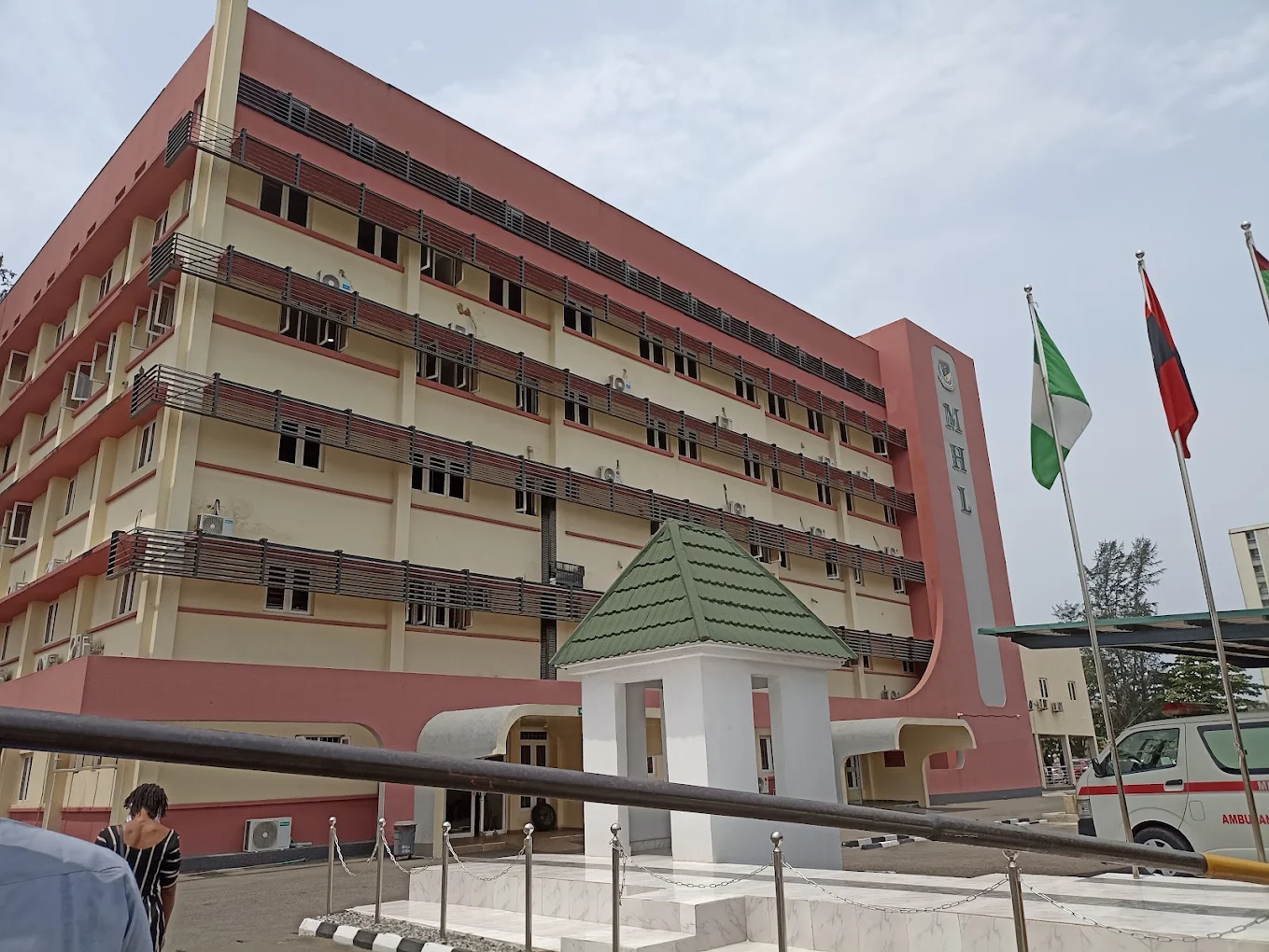
Front View of Military Hospital, Lagos

Creek Hospital (formerly Federal Staff Hospital, Lagos, also known as Military Hospital, Lagos) is a hospital in Onikan, Lagos Island.

== History ==
Creek Hospital was originally a European hospital established in the 1880s to cater for the health of European expatriates in colonial Lagos. Dr. Gray and Atkins were the pioneer staff doctors. The hospital had a good reputation of medical expertise in Nigeria. The hospital acquired its current name (Creek Hospital) in 1924, when the colonial government took over from the hospital. In 1925, Dr. Grays' Creek Hospital was renamed European Hospital. The hospital was later renamed as Military Hospital, Onikan, Lagos in 1947. Creek Hospital's facility (Federal Staff Hospital) at Awolowo Road, Ikoyi, Lagos continued operations at Apo Legislative Quarters after federal civil servants moved from Lagos to Abuja. Creek Hospital was upgraded from a 28–bed health facility to a 150–bed hospital to provide additional medical services to Lagosians.

== Services ==
- Orthopaedic Surgery:
- Dental Department
- General Out-Patient Department
- Outpatient & Emergency Care
- Eye Care services
- ear ans nose department
- Maternity & Wards
- Obstetrics & Gynaecology (O&G
