= List of hospitals in Azerbaijan =

This list of hospitals in Azerbaijan includes notable hospitals in Azerbaijan.

- Bona Dea International Hospital, Baku, Azerbaijan
- Ganja International Hospital, Ganja, Azerbaijan
- Republican Treatment and Diagnostic Center, Baku
- Shusha Hospital, Shusha
