= Health in Suriname =

The Human Rights Measurement Initiative finds that Suriname is fulfilling 78.4% of what it should be fulfilling for the right to health based on its level of income. When looking at the right to health with respect to children, Suriname achieves 94.0% of what is expected based on its current income. In regards to the right to health amongst the adult population, the country achieves only 83.2% of what is expected based on the nation's level of income. Suriname falls into the "very bad" category when evaluating the right to reproductive health because the nation is fulfilling only 57.9% of what the nation is expected to achieve based on the resources (income) it has available.

In 2018 life expectancy in Suriname was 68.7 for men and 75.1 for women ranking the country 107th in the world.

The fertility rate in Suriname was at 2.6 births per woman in 2009. Public expenditure was at 3.6% of the GDP in 2004, whereas private expenditure was at 4.2%. There were 45 physicians per 100,000 in the early 2000s. Infant mortality was at 30 per 1,000 live births. Male life expectancy at birth was at 66.4 years, whereas female life expectancy at birth was at 73 years.

== Healthcare ==
The National Basic Health Insurance Law, 2014, provides access to a basic package of primary, secondary, and tertiary care services for citizens.

The Regional Health Services operates 43 public primary health clinics in the coastal area where there are also about 150 private primary care clinics. Medische Zending runs 52 primary healthcare centres in the interior. There are 6 hospitals, two of which are regional.

Psychiatric care is provided by the Psychiatric Centre Suriname in Paramaribo.

== Infectious diseases ==
Malaria is present in the region near the border with French Guiana. About 80,000 people are at a risk as of 2016. The Ministry of Health has set up a malaria eradication program which has resulted in the eradication in the villages of the interior. Suriname is periodically suffering from a dengue fever outbreak. During the 1999-2000 outbreak, five people died.
