= Health in Montenegro =

Montenegro is a country with an area of 13,812 square kilometres and a population of 620,029, according to the 2011 census. The country is bordered by Croatia, the Adriatic Sea, Bosnia, Herzegovina, Serbia, Kosovo and Albania. The most common health issues faced are non-communicable diseases accounting for 95% of all deaths. This is followed by 4% of mortality due to injury, and 1% due to communicable, maternal, perinatal and nutritional conditions. Other health areas of interest are alcohol consumption, which is the most prevalent disease of addiction within Montenegro and smoking. Montenegro has one of the highest tobacco usage rates across Europe. Life expectancy for men is 74 years, and life expectancy for women is 79.

The Human Rights Measurement Initiative finds that Montenegro is fulfilling 70.6% of what it should be fulfilling for the right to health based on its level of income. When looking at the right to health with respect to children, Montenegro achieves 100.0% of what is expected based on its current income. In regards to the right to health amongst the adult population, the country achieves only 92.9% of what is expected based on the nation's level of income. Montenegro falls into the "very bad" category when evaluating the right to reproductive health because the nation is fulfilling only 18.9% of what the nation is expected to achieve based on the resources (income) it has available.

== Health status ==
=== Alcohol consumption ===
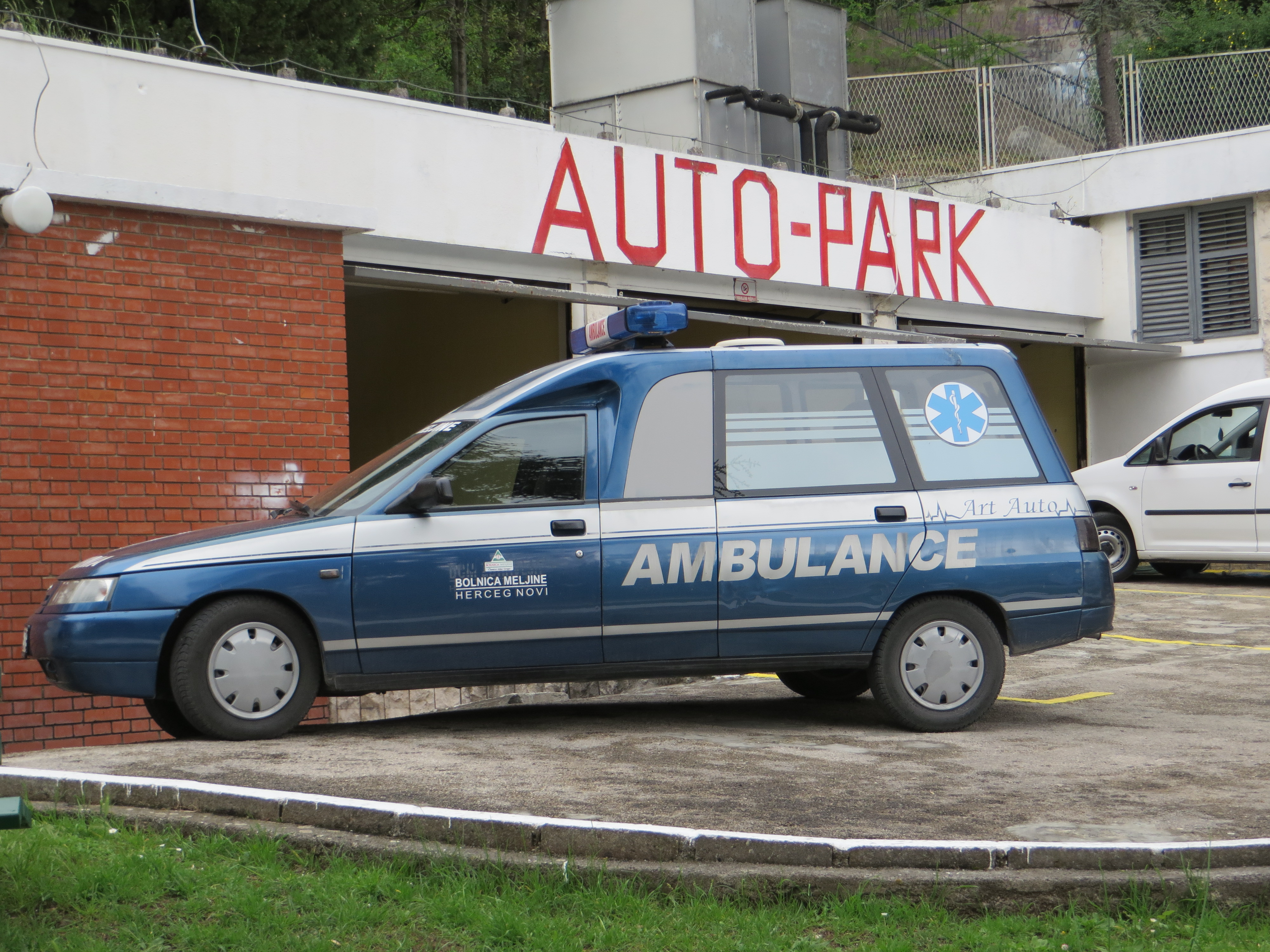
Ambulance in Montenegro

According to the Montenegro Ministry of Health alcoholism is the most prevalent disease of addiction within Montenegro. There are an estimated 30,000 alcoholics within Montenegro out of approximately 620,000 inhabitants. Montenegrins consume 12.8 litres annually. Average global consumption is around 7 litres per person. 20% of Montenegro do not consume alcohol, making the consumption per capita higher. Total costs of GDP attributed to alcohol is between 2% and 5%.

Legal minimum age for purchase of alcohol both on and off premises is 18. National blood alcohol limit for driving a vehicle is 0.3%.

In 2009, elementary schools introduced a school subject called 'Healthy Lifestyles', including study on substance abuse prevention. The intended action area of this plan was community and workplace action towards alcoholism in Montenegro.

In 2012, the National strategy to prevent harmful use of alcohol and alcohol-related disorders in Montenegro, was developed and published. It presented a plan for 2013 to 2020. Areas of priority in the strategy include:

- Restricting availability of alcohol
- Restricted/controlled marketing of alcohol
- Pricing policy
- Reduce impact and use of unrecorded alcohol
- Reduce harmful consequence of intoxication

=== Smoking ===
Montenegro has one of the highest tobacco-usage rates across Europe.

Prevalence of males and females aged 15 and over was 45.90% as of 2016. This is a 0.2% decline from 2015 when it was at 46.10%. Tobacco use has decreased over the last several years, at a less than 1% decrease each year.

One of the precautions Montenegro has enforced to reduce tobacco use is its ban on smoking in public indoor spaces. The laws began taking effect on August 14, 2019, as although an anti-tobacco law was introduced in 2004 it did not lead to the desired results. The law will ban smoking in all public places such as restaurants, and cafes (however excludes casinos), and violation results in a fine ranging from $560 to $22,370.

=== Communicable diseases ===
In 2016, 1% of mortality was accounted to communicable, maternal, perinatal and nutritional conditions. Neonatal disorders are the communicable disease that causes the most premature death in Montenegro. It has decreased in its causing of premature death, from 4th most likely cause of premature death in 2007, to 15th most common cause of premature death in 2017.

=== Noncommunicable diseases ===
Non-communicable diseases account for 95% of all deaths in Montenegro. In 2016, 58% of this is accounted to by cardiovascular diseases, 22% cancers, 3% respiratory diseases, 2% diabetes, 10% other NCDs.

Stroke is the cause of the most deaths in Montenegro, and the most premature death from 2007 to 2017. Over the 10 years, deaths by stroke decreased by 0.9%. Ischemic heart disease caused the second most number of deaths in Montenegro from 2007 to 2017. Over the 10 years, the prevalence of premature deaths from this disease decreased by 2.3%. Lung cancer was the third most fatal diseases in Montenegro from 2007 to 2017. In this period, premature deaths caused by lung cancer increased by 8%.

==== Cardiovascular disease ====
The key cardiovascular disease risk factors are

- smoking (in 2008 one third of the adult population smoked)
- hypertension (41.7% of adults had hypertension in 2008)
- hypercholesterolemia (40% of adults had hypercholesterolemia in 2008)
- obesity (15.1% of adults in 2008, 40% overweight)
- diabetes mellitus and physical inactivity (in 2008 11.5% of adults regularly performed physical activity)

==== Cancer ====
Cancer accounted for 1,287 deaths in Montenegro in 2018, 753 in males and 534 in females. There were 2,366 new cases in 2018, 1,226 in males and 1,140 in females. The five most frequent cancers for both sexes are; breast, lung, colorectal, prostate, bladder. The five most frequent cancers for males are; lung, prostate, colorectal, larynx, bladder. The five most frequent cancers for females are; breast, lung, colorectal, cervix uteri, corpus uteri.

==== Diabetes ====
In 2015 it was estimated that 12% of the population of Montenegro had diabetes.

=== Mental health ===
Montenegro's first official policy on mental healthcare was implemented in 2004 with the Strategy for Improving Mental Health. This strategy set goals regarding general health policy along with steps to develop and implement a national strategy of promotion of mental health.

The Law on the Protection and Realisation of the Rights of the Mentally Ill was implemented in 2005 as a pathway for protecting rights of the mentally ill. The Law covers issues of mental health such as: voluntary and forced hospitalisation; recommendations and grounds for compulsory treatment; treatment in less restrictive environments; and more.

The Action Plan for Improving Mental Health was adopted in 2011 to support the Strategy for Improving Mental Health. It assisted in refining and redefining the laws Montenegro already possessed and aligning these better with the European union and World Health Organisation Standards.

=== HIV/AIDS ===
First case of AIDS was reported in 1989. In 2018 it was estimated that less than 500 adults aged 15 and over in Montenegro are living in Montenegro. Prevalence for adults aged 15 to 49 with HIV is 0.1%. Women aged over 15 living with HIV is estimated to be under 100. Men aged over 15 living with HIV is estimated to be under 500. Adult and child deaths due to AIDS is estimated to be less than 100. ART treatment is covered 100% by the State in Montenegro available to all children in need in an effort to eliminate new HIV infections among children.

== Nutrition ==
=== Adult nutrition status (20+) ===
Diabetes in adults has risen. Between 2000 and 2002, the prevalence in women was 6.3%, and 6.1% in men. This rose to 6.6% and 7.6% in women and men respectively in 2014. This is projected to continue rising, with estimates for 2025 at 7.7% and 10.2% for women and men respectively.

The prevalence of raised blood pressure in adults has decreased. For men prevalence was at 36.5% in 2000, and decreased to 34.4 in 2015. For women, prevalence was at 28.9% in 2000, and has decreased to 23.8% in 2015.

Prevalence of overweight and obese individuals has risen. From 2000 to 2016, the prevalence of overweight in women has risen from 45.7% to 52.5%. The prevalence of obesity in women has risen from 17.6% to 23.3%. In men, overweight prevalence has risen from 55% to 66.3%. Obesity prevalence has risen from 14.5% to 23.1%.

=== Children and adolescents (5–19) ===
Prevalence of underweight children and adolescents has decreased since 2000. Underweight females have dropped from 17.8% to 14.6%. Underweight prevalence in males has from 16% to 11.4%.

The prevalence of overweight and obese children and adolescents has risen since 2000. In females, overweight prevalence has risen from 11.4% to 19.6%. Obesity prevalence in females has risen from 2% to 5.3%. In males, overweight prevalence has risen from 16.5% to 30%. Obesity in males has risen from 3.8% to 9.8%.

Montenegro has shown the fight against childhood obesity is a priority through programmes such as 'the Fruit, Vegetables, Milk and Milk Products Programme' for schools. This programme was initiated by the Ministry of Agriculture in elementary schools. It involves a multi-sectorial approach, where free milk and fruit meals are distributed to elementary school children weekly. It also educated children about healthy nutrition, nutritional food value and agriculture.

=== Infants (0-4) ===
Stunting in infants has risen nationally, from a prevalence of 7.9% in 2005, to 9.4% in 2013. Prevalence is higher in males, at 10.3% in 2013, compared to 8.4% in females.

Prevalence in overweight infants has also risen, from a prevalence of 15.6% in 2005, to 22.3% in 2013. Prevalence is higher in males, at 24.7% in 2013, compared to 19.6% in females.

=== Policies and actions ===
The following policies and actions are in place to assist in areas surrounding nutrition:

- Salt reduction initiatives – an initiative was introduced December 17, 2012, in response to evidence of a link between excessive salt intake and non-communicable diseases, such as cardiovascular disease.
- Food and nutrition action plan – addresses issues surrounding marketing of food and beverage towards children.
- Law of food and safety – introduced December 21, 2007, this law defines marketing and presentation of food products available in media.
- Law on Protection of Consumers – introduced May 16, 2007. Forbids advertisement of food to minors.

== Life expectancy ==
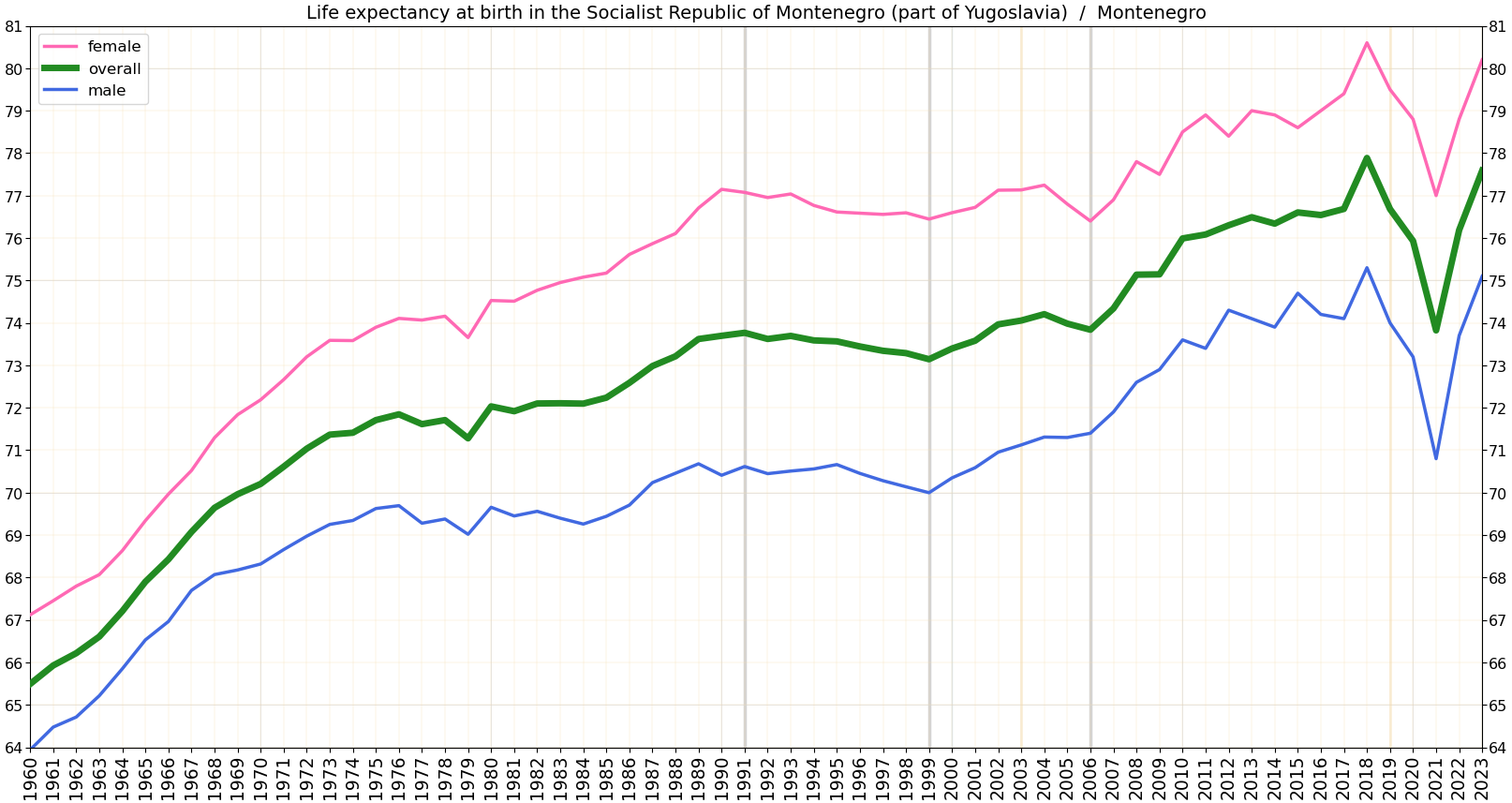
Life expectancy at birth in Montenegro

In 2018, the life expectancy at birth is 76.77. This varies for men and women, at 74.317 and 79.199 respectively. The current life expectancy is higher than the past several years. For example, in 2010 it was 75.151, and in 2000 it was 73.228. There are various proposed reasons to account for the increase in life expectancy. Some studies have suggested that living in an urban centre results in a longer life, compared to those living rurally. The rural population of Montenegro declined to 35.78% in 2016, compared to 81.21% in 1960.

Over the past several years, mortality rates for both male and female adults has decreased. As of 2018, mortality rate for adult males (per 1000 adults) was 125.094, which has decreased as can be seen through comparing to 2010 when it was at 147.104. As of 2018, mortality for adult females (per 1000 adults) was 65.97, which has also decreased when compared to 2010, when it was at 82.022.

The current, 2020 mortality rate of infants in Montenegro is 2.586 deaths per 1000 live births. This shows a 3.25% decline from 2019 when it was 2.673. Infant mortality has been decreasing steadily over the past several years, demonstrated by a 3.15% decline between 2018 and 2019, and a 9.86% decline between 2018 and 2017.

== Health information for travellers ==
=== Vaccinations ===
Various vaccines are recommended for travellers to Montenegro. Hepatitis A and B are recommended for all travellers, if not previously vaccinated. Typhoid is recommended for those travellers who are likely to eat in places other than major food chains and hotels. Measles Mumps and Rubella (MMR) vaccine is also recommended for those who have not already received 2 doses. Rabies is suggested for travellers who are at a high risk of animal contact (including dogs, bats, and other carnivores). In flu season, the influenza vaccination is also recommended.

=== Health risks ===
COVID-19 is currently present in Montenegro and poses a health risk.

Tick-borne encephalitis is a risk, particularly within forests, fields and country environments. In order to avoid tick bites, take precaution before and after visiting a forest, by checking the body for ticks and removing fully any ticks found as soon as possible.

Avian flu has also occurred in the region. Although no human cases have been reported there is evidence of cases in poultry

== Healthcare ==
According to the Health Consumer Powerhouse the country has "the most backward health system in Europe". Public services are financed through the Health Insurance Fund. It is funded by payroll contributions of 10.5%. About 5% of the national budget is allocated to healthcare. Only €5 million was provided for all public hospital supplies in 2016, about a third of what was thought necessary. 72.5% of total health spending comes from the fund. Most of the rest is direct out-of-pocket payments.

The Ministry of Health in Montenegro guides a national health fund. Contributions of employer's and employee's entitles citizens to health care. This program covers most medical services, except from particular physicians.

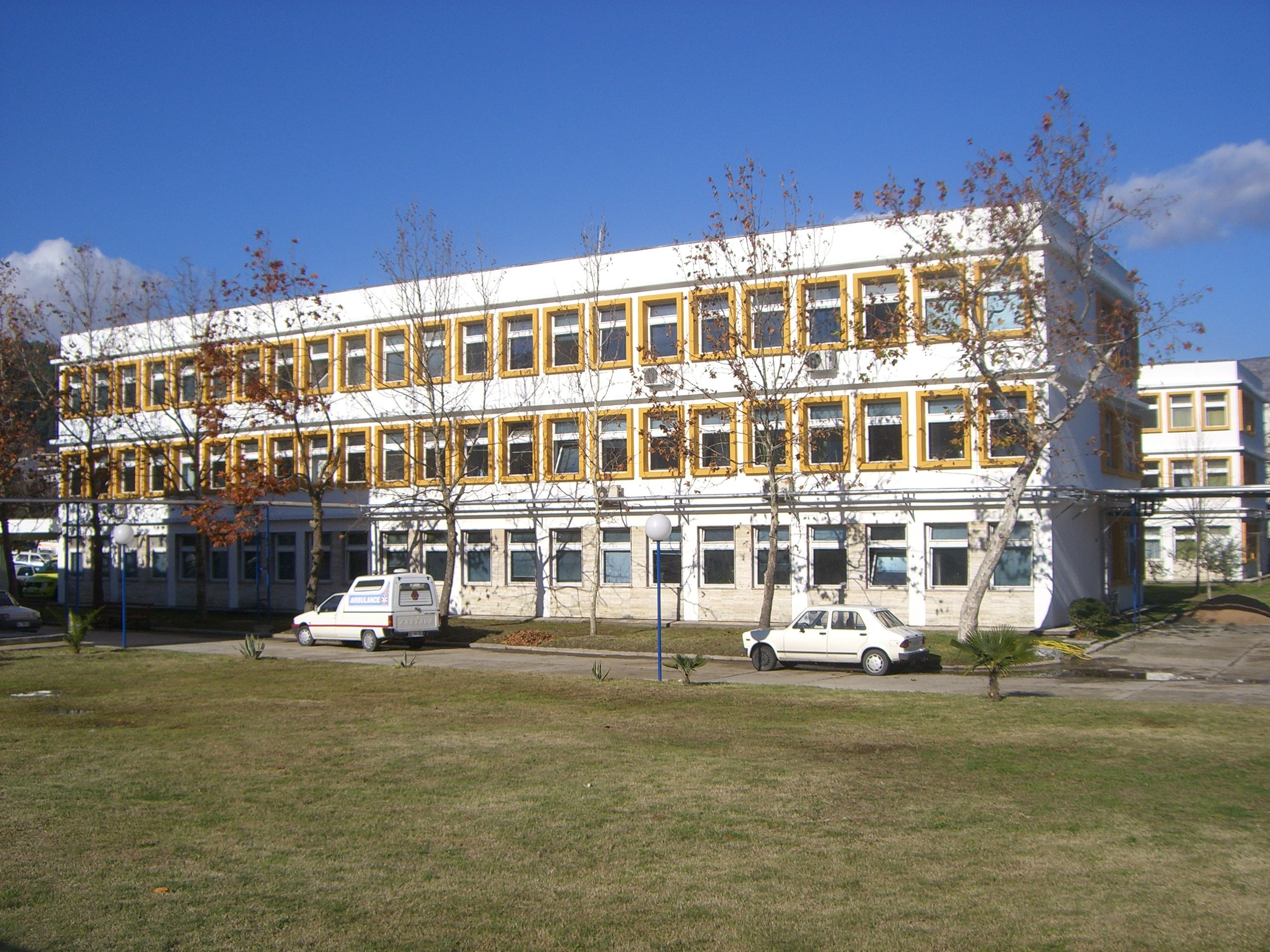
A local hospital in Ulcinj, Montenegro

=== Funding and spending ===
Healthcare spending in Montenegro is roughly $578 per capita, Montenegro spent $365 million on healthcare in 2010. The majority of health care (two-thirds) is paid for through government expenditure, the remained is via household expenditures (30%) and other sources (3%). 14% of government spending goes to health (6% GDP) in 2010.

=== Staffing ===
There are 199 doctors per 100,000 people and 554 nurses and midwives per 100,000 people in Montenegro. This is lower than the European average which has 325 and 554 doctors and nurses respectively per 100,000. They also have the lowest proportion of pharmacists per head in Europe – 17 per 100,000 in 2015.

=== Facilities ===
Montenegro has 19 health centres, and 10 hospitals. Along with private physicians and dentists. There are three specialist centres:

- The Podgorica Clinical Centre is the main public hospital. Necessary supplies were calculated to cost €11.4 million in 2016. It was reported that there were severe shortages of basic supplies and equipment in public hospitals. Tests were repeatedly postponed because of lack of supplies or broken equipment. Many patients are referred for treatment outside the country.
- Institute for Health
- Pharmaceutical Institute of Montenegro
- Private Hospital “A3 Medical” Sutomore, Bar
- General Hospital “Blažo Orlandić” Bar
- General Hospital Berane
- General Hospital Bijelo Polje
- General Hospital “Danilo I” Cetinje
- General Hospital Kotor
- General Hospital Nikšić
- General Hospital Pljevlja
