= Health in Bosnia and Herzegovina =

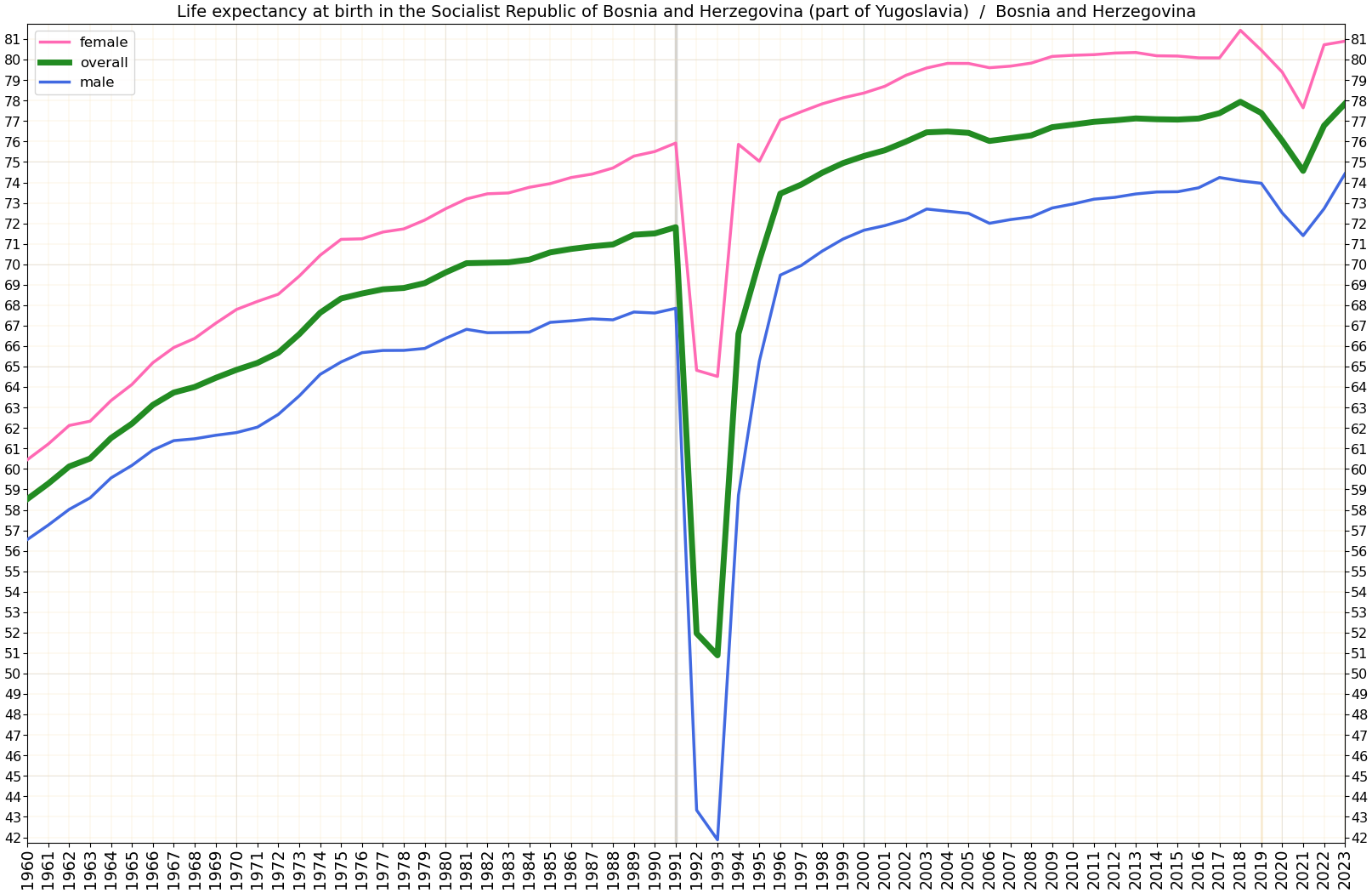
Life expectancy at birth in Bosnia and Herzegovina

Health in Bosnia and Herzegovina was impacted by the Bosnian War of the early 1990s, during which Bosnia and Herzegovina declared their independence. Bosnia faced many challenges during the war, including bombings throughout the country that ruined much of the infrastructure. Parallel regimes took over Bosnia and flipped the country upside down with land mines, bullets, and bombings. The war displaced over 800,000 refugees and killed over 100,000 people. The war in Bosnia also consisted of an ethnic "cleanse" of Bosnian Muslims initiated by Bosnian Serbs, which included containment of Bosniaks in concentration camps. There were atrocities committed by all sides. The war ended with NATO involvement and the Dayton Agreement in 1995. The Dayton Agreement acknowledges Bosnia and Herzegovina as a democratic country and the country is moving toward the basic principals that accompany that, such as civil rights and equality. During the war there was minimal attention given to the standard of health and major public health concerns, such as pest control, hygiene, disinfection, and import and export programs, were all interrupted or stopped. The war affected Bosnia in many ways. The war torn country not only lost much of the infrastructure, but the economy and the governmental system were also affected. It is estimated that there are still thousands of people living as refugees and a large portion of the population still fall under the United Nations High Commission of Refugees category of a refugee or displaced person. The shortcomings of the current health care system include the lack of communication between health care centers, lack of skills, and lack of standards that are uniform throughout the country.

The Human Rights Measurement Initiative finds that Bosnia and Herzegovina is fulfilling 70.1% of what it should be fulfilling for the right to health based on its level of income. When looking at the right to health with respect to children, Bosnia and Herzegovina achieves 99.6% of what is expected based on its current income. In regards to the right to health amongst the adult population, the country achieves only 95.6% of what is expected based on the nation's level of income. Bosnia and Herzegovina falls into the "very bad" category when evaluating the right to reproductive health because the nation is fulfilling only 15.0% of what the nation is expected to achieve based on the resources (income) it has available.

== Health issues ==
The war has resulted in lower socioeconomic statuses of Bosnia's citizens, raised new health concerns, caused epidemiological changes, and changed the focus of the community. Some of the environmental factors that have had an effect on health include limited trash disposal sites, water shortages, and infrastructure destruction. Smoking is a large problem, as well as increased drug and alcohol use after the war. Posttraumatic stress disorder (PTSD), as well as other psychological traumas, have appeared in high numbers after the war. The war in Bosnia was different from other modern day wars in terms of the leading cause of death. It is usually the case that the leading cause of death for civilians is the outbreak of infectious disease, but in Bosnia and Herzegovina the leading cause of death was war-related trauma.

In 2015 it was estimated that 12.01% of the population has diabetes, costing about $523 per person per year. It had the fourth highest rate of male smokers in Europe - 47%.

=== Psychological traumas and disorders ===
The war resulted in increased numbers of psychological traumas and disorders. These can cause the individual to face problems in the workforce as well as their personal and family life, and can even lead to suicide. Currently in Bosnia the psychiatric and neurologic departments are just one department, with no differentiation between the two. This can cause issues to arise between patients as well as a lack of specialization when it comes to treatment. Posttraumatic stress disorder is a rising disorder for the post-war country, yet there is very little treatment or focus on the disease. Most of the treatment is done through Non-Governmental Organizations (NGOs), who will eventually leave Bosnia and Herzegovina.

== Problems ==
Some of the issues that Bosnia is currently facing in terms of bettering their health care system in order to address the rising health concerns includes the fact that there is not enough technical infrastructure and management capacity to cause change in the short term. There is also a weak regulatory process as well as a lack of communication between local and central levels of the health care system. The country is also still receiving aid from international sources that also lack coordination between international and local services and care; the two sources don't function as one but as two separate providers of care.

According to some experts programs initiated by NGOs, United Nations, and NATO, to name a few, focused more so on long-term effects instead of focusing on long-term as well as short-term reforms. In many places programs focused on academic settings, for the betterment of medical knowledge and schools, before the people had access to basic public health needs, such as clean water.

== Reforms and programs ==
The Federation Health Program of 1994 was implemented as part of the reform process. This included a set of proposals by the Ministry of Health and created two new laws, the Law on Health Care and the Law on Health Insurance. The Law on Health Care focuses on the delivery of services and the family medicine model. The Law on Health Insurance insures each person receives a basic health care package regardless of income and resources available. A program launched by the National Research Council, called "Trauma and Reconciliation in Bosnia-Herzegovina", focused on conducting research while including cross-cultural experience for American and Bosnian experts. The program organized meetings with professionals from a variety of organizations, including NGOs, children's homes, and women's organizations to gain a local perspective on what should be done to help address the rising health issues due to war caused trauma. They concluded that around 18%-38% of residents suffered from PTSD during or after the war. Other programs, such as those organized by Doctor's without Borders, Harvard Trauma Program for Refugees, and the International Center for Psychosocial Trauma by the University of Missouri-Columbia were all launched with an aim to help provide further education for family doctors when it came to trauma and psychological issues. The Swiss Agency for Development and Cooperation (SDC) also led a program, "Mental Health", to help address the trauma issues that this vulnerable population might face. This program addresses the problem by providing financial support for other projects and reforms taking place, providing additional training for experts, and helping to address the stigma in the public associated with mental health issues. The "Mental Health" program includes over 55 municipalities throughout Bosnia and focuses on helping fight the negative stigma associated with mental health and urges the people to seek for help.
