= Healthcare in Moldova =

The Republic of Moldova has a universal health care system.

The Human Rights Measurement Initiative finds that Moldova is fulfilling 78.2% of what it should be fulfilling for the right to health based on its level of income. When looking at the right to health with respect to children, Moldova achieves 96.7% of what is expected based on its current income. In regards to the right to health amongst the adult population, the country achieves only 84.7% of what is expected based on the nation's level of income. Moldova falls into the "very bad" category when evaluating the right to reproductive health because the nation is fulfilling only 53.2% of what the nation is expected to achieve based on the resources (income) it has available.

== History ==
The Republic of Moldova became independent in 1991. Since that time the country has become a parliamentary republic and has embarked on an ambitious programme of economic reform. Agriculture and food processing dominate the economy and the country is dependent on imports for its energy needs. Economic transition has caused great socioeconomic hardship in the country and the health status of the population has fallen. There has been a steep rise in the death rate and there has been large-scale labour migration – currently 40% of the working age population works abroad and remittances account for 30% of GDP.

Health care in Moldova has known dynamic development in the past years, the hospitals being equipped with ultra-modern equipment, the new surgical blocks and general medical departments being built in the capital city of Chișinău. The birth rate is at one and a half children per woman. Public expenditure on health was 4.2% of the GDP and private expenditure on health 3.2%. There are about 264 physicians per 100,000 people. Health expenditure was 138 US$ (PPP) per capita in 2004. In 2011, accordingly to World Bank, the health expenditures per capita were at about 223 US$.

== Health system ==
The reform of health financing in the Republic of Moldova began in earnest in 2004 with the introduction of a mandatory health insurance (MHI) system. Since then, MHI has become a sustainable financing mechanism that has improved the technical and allocative efficiency of the system as well as overall transparency. This has helped to further consolidate the prioritization of primary care in the system, which has been based on a family medicine model since the 1990s. Hospital stock in the country has been reduced since independence as the country inherited a Semashko health system with excessive infrastructure, but there is still room for efficiency gains, particularly through the consolidation of specialist services in the capital city. The rationalization of duplicated specialized services, therefore, remains a key challenge facing the Moldovan health system. Other challenges include health workforce shortages (particularly in rural areas) and improving equity in financing and access to care by reducing out of pocket (OOP) payments. OOP spending on health is dominated by the cost of pharmaceuticals and this is currently a core focus of reform efforts.

== Health status ==
=== Main causes of death ===
The Republic of Moldova has a double epidemiological burden as rates of both communicable and noncommunicable diseases have steadily increased since independence. The main causes of death in the Republic of Moldova are diseases of the circulatory system followed by cancer and diseases of the digestive system. Many of these deaths can be attributed to very heavy alcohol and tobacco consumption – 57.6% of total male mortality and 62.3% of female mortality in 2010 could be attributed to smoking-related causes while 18.8% of male mortality and 13.7% of female mortality were related to alcohol consumption. Though incidence of chronic liver disease and cirrhosis has decreased over the last five years, this remains a very significant overall cause of mortality in the Republic of Moldova (118.95 per population of 100 000 men and 89.82 per population of 100 000 women in 2010).

=== Mental health ===
The economic and social crises have negatively influenced the population's mental health: a continuous increase in the incidence of mental health disorders has been registered (500.22 per 100,000 general population in 2005 and 576.13 per 100,000 general population in 2009).

=== HIV/AIDS and tuberculosis ===
However, the key challenges in communicable disease control in the Republic of Moldova are tuberculosis (TB) and HIV/AIDS. Incidence of TB has been rising since 1990 and has more than doubled, reaching 182 per 100 000 population in 2010, the most dramatic increase being registered in children. The TB mortality rate increased from 16.9 per 100 000 people in 2000 to 23 in 2010, and rates in prisons are even much higher.

=== Children's health ===
Moldova is among the few countries in the world which reached its Millennium objective of reducing child mortality, registering a mortality rate of 13.4 to 1,000 live births in 2011 in children under 5 (compared to 23.3 in 2000). The most frequent causes of young children's deaths in Moldova are accidents, intoxications, traumas, as well as diseases of the respiratory apparatus – causes which can be prevented if parents and caregivers would supervise children better.

Infant mortality The infant mortality rate has been falling steadily since the mid-1990s reaching 11.8 per 1000 live births in 2010, which is close to average for countries of the CIS (11.7 per 1000 live births in 2010), but still more than double the European Union average of 4.2 per 1000 live births in 2010. Maternal mortality levels have fluctuated widely, reaching a low of 16 per 100 000 births in 2006 and 21 maternal deaths per 100 000 live births in 2013. This is almost double the average for countries of the European Union, which was 6.1 in 2010. However, actual numbers are low (18 in 2010, 7 in 2009) and as there are only around 40 000 births annually each tragic death increases the maternal mortality rate substantially.

Child immunization Child immunization levels have been consistently high in the Republic of Moldova for all vaccine-preventable diseases, and in 2010, 97.1% of children were immunized against measles, 97.9% of infants were vaccinated against TB, 97.4% against polio and 97.6% against hepatitis B. The combined vaccination for diphtheria, pertussis and tetanus (DPT) covered 89.8% of infants in 2010, and vaccination against Haemophilus influenzae type b covered 61.2% of infants. Sexually transmitted infections sharply increased following independence, with syphilis showing one of the biggest increases (71.51 per 100 000 population in 2008).

Health indicators
Health indicator	1991	2013
Under-five mortality rate (by 1,000 live births)	33,3	16,6
Maternal mortality ratio (by 100,000 live births)	60,6	21
Fertility rate	2,31	1,26
Life expectancy	66,5	72,3

== Life expectancy ==
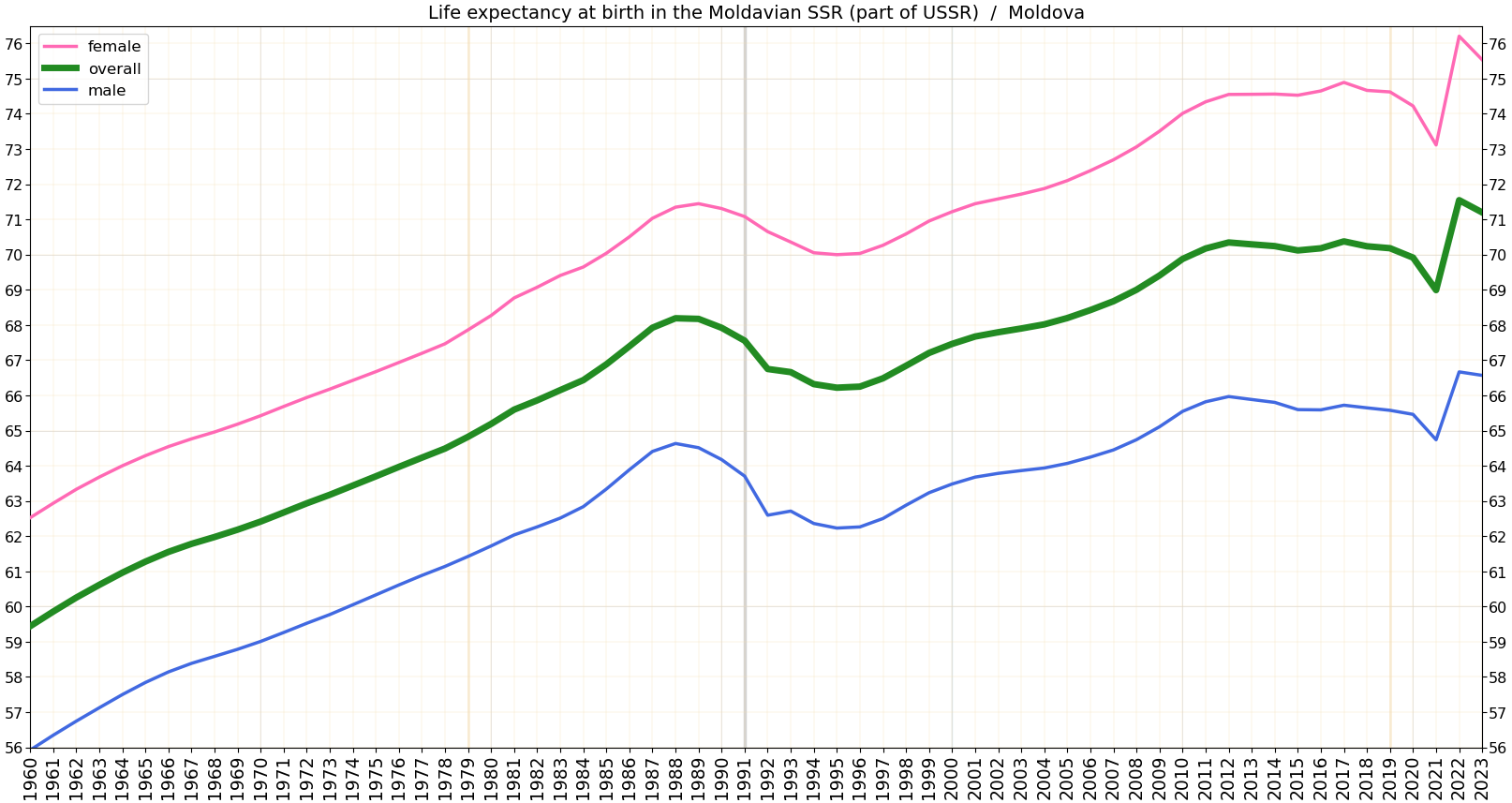
Life expectancy at birth in Moldova

Despite the Republic of Moldova being the poorest country in the WHO European Region, life expectancy estimates are 2–5 years higher than similar estimates for considerably richer countries in the Commonwealth of Independent States (CIS), namely 69.13 years in 2010. Mortality rates are particularly high for the working age population – and the reduction of life expectancy through death before 65 years of age was 12 years for men and 6.4 years for women in 2010. This has contributed to a significant and growing gender gap in life expectancy: 64.86 for males and 73.5 years for females in 2010. This is also reflected in disability-adjusted life expectancy (DALE), which was 58 years for men and 63 years for women in 2007.

== Emergency aid ==
The largest national emergency aid service is concentrated and is being in service within Chișinău – the capital region of Moldova. Nowadays in Chișinău operate 600 ambulance municipal cars, instead of 92 how is required and a dozen cars of private emergency service - Calmed. Every day there are registered and served 800 emergency calls within Chișinău and more than 2000 emergency calls within the whole Moldova per day. The core of emergency system in Chișinău is National Scientific and Practical Centre for Emergency Medicine with 620 beds and a staff of 3138 personnel.

== Hospitals ==
In 2002, there were 14 Republican hospitals, mainly in the capital city, providing specialized tertiary care and 7,995 beds. In addition, there are parallel hospital services offered by for staff of the Ministries of Defense, Railways, Internal Affairs, Intelligence Services, Justice, Frontier Guard troops and the Medical Service of the State Chancery. At the regional level there are 10 general hospitals providing tertiary care in each of the administrative regions, 13 district hospitals providing secondary care, and 11 municipal hospitals.

Some of the more notable hospitals are listed in the sections below.

=== Republican hospitals ===
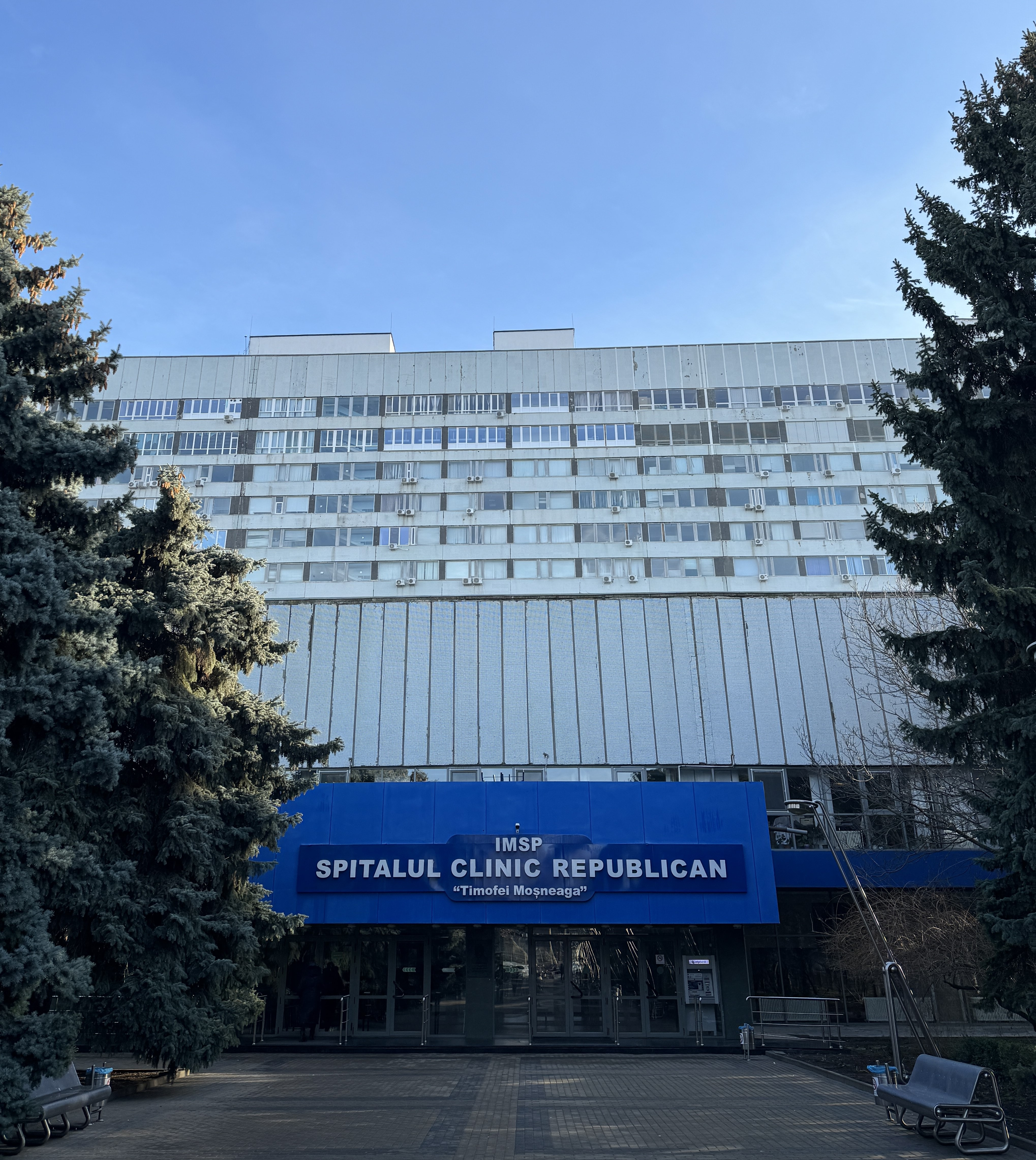
Timofei Moșneaga Republican Clinical Hospital

- Timofei Moșneaga Republican Clinical Hospital, Chișinău (founded in 1817, 772 beds)
- Republican Clinic of Stomatology (Dentistry), Chișinău
- Ministry of Health Clinical Hospital, Chișinău
- Republican Clinical Hospital for Traumatology and Orthopedics
- Emergency Medicine Institute, Chișinău
- Psychiatric Clinical Hospital, Chișinău
- Republican Dermatovenerology Dispensary
- Republican Phthisiopneumology Hospital, Vorniceni
- Cardiology Institute, Chișinău
- Chiril Draganiuc Institute of Pneumology, Chișinău
- Oncological Institute, Chișinău
- Diomid Gherman Institute of Neurology and Neurosurgery, Chișinău
- Republican Narcology Dispensary, Chișinău
- Mother and Child Institute, Chișinău
- Republican Psychiatric Hospital, Bălți
- Republican Psychiatric Hospital, Orhei

=== District hospitals ===
- District Hospital Anenii Noi
- District Hospital Basarabeasca
- District Hospital Briceni
- District Hospital Cahul
- District Hospital Cantemir
- District Hospital Călăraşi
- District Hospital Căușeni
- District Hospital Cimișlia
- District Hospital Criuleni
- District Hospital Donduşeni
- District Hospital Drochia
- Dubăsari District (No hospital)
- District Hospital Edineț
- District Hospital Făleşti
- District Hospital Floreşti
- District Hospital Glodeni
- District Hospital Hînceşti
- District Hospital Ialoveni
- District Hospital Leova
- District Hospital Nisporeni B
- District Hospital Ocniţa
- District Hospital Orhei
- District Hospital Rezina
- District Hospital Rîşcani
- District Hospital Sîngerei
- District Hospital Soroca
- District Hospital Străşeni
- District Hospital Şoldăneşti
- District Hospital Ștefan Vodă
- District Hospital Taraclia
- District Hospital Teleneşti
- District Hospital Ungheni

District hospitals in major cities:

- District Hospital Ceadâr-Lunga (City)
- District Hospital Comrat (City)
- District Hospital Vulcăneşti (City)
- District Hospital Balti (City)

=== Municipal hospitals ===
- Children's Municipal Clinical Hospital No. 1, Chișinău
- Gheorghe Paladi Municipal Clinical Hospital, Chișinău
- Holy Trinity Municipal Clinical Hospital, Chișinău
- Valentin Ignatenco Children's Municipal Clinical Hospital, Chișinău
- Municipal Clinical Hospital, Bălţi
- St. Michael the Archangel Municipal Clinical Hospital, Chișinău (established in 1829)
- Municipal Clinical Ftiziopneumology Hospital
- Municipal Maternity No. 2, Chișinău
- Municipal Clinical Hospital for Children with Infectious Diseases, Chișinău
- Municipal Clinical Hospital No. 4, Chișinău

=== Other hospitals ===
- Central Military Hospital, Chișinău
- Medpark International Hospital, Chișinău
- Vivodent Clinic, Chișinău

=== Hospitals in Transnistria ===
The following hospitals are in the break-away province of Transnistria

- Republican Clinical Hospital Tiraspol, Transnistria
