= Health in Northern Cyprus =

Life expectancy for men in Northern Cyprus is 78 years and for women 83 years.

== Health Care ==
Northern Cyprus has a public healthcare system which is available to all those who have social security insurance, and their partners and children. Use of the accident and emergency departments is free to anyone. 2023 patients were sent for treatment in Turkey at public expense in 2010, 22% for cardiovascular disease and 16% for cancer treatment. There are also private hospitals and private polyclinics and it is possible for people to get treatment in the Republic of Cyprus.

=== Hospitals ===
The following is a list of notable hospitals in Northern Cyprus:

- Dr. Akçiçek Devlet Hastanesi Hospital/Kyrenia General Hospital (Public), Kyrenia
- Barış Mental Hospital, in Lefkoşa
- Dr. Burhan Nalbantoğlu State Hospital, Lefkoşa
- British Medical Hospital, Girne
- Cengiz Topel Hospital, in Lefke
- Cyprus Life Hospital, Lefkoşa
- Etik Hospital, in Lefkoşa
- Famagusta State Hospital
- Famagusta Life Hospital
- Girne University Hospital, a teaching hospital in Girne
- Kamiloğlu Hospital, Girne
- Kolan British Hospital (Kyrenia), Nicosia
- Magusa Tip Merkezi Medical Centre Hospital (Cyprus Central Hospital), in Famagusta
- Medical Port Tunççevik Hospital, Girne
- Near East University Hospital, a teaching hospital in Lefkoşa
- NİS Hospital, in Lefkoşa and Famagusta
- Özel Başkent Hospital, in Lefkoşa
