= Health in Uruguay =

Development of life expectancy in Uruguay

In 2016, the life expectancy in Uruguay was 73 for men and 81 for women.

== Health statistics ==
2011 figures:

- Fertility rate – 140th most fertile, at 1.89 per woman
- Birth rate – 157th most births, at 13.91 per 1000 people
- Infant mortality – 128th most deaths, 8.73 per 1000 live births in 2017. In 1975 it was 48.6 per 1,000 live births
- Death rate – 84th death rate at 9.16 per 1000 people
- Life expectancy – 47th at 76.4 years
- Suicide rate – 24th suicide rate per 100,000 (15.1 for males and 6.4 for females)
- HIV/AIDS rate – 108th at 0.30%

== Healthcare ==
For the first half of the twentieth century Uruguay and Argentina had the most advanced standards of medical care in Latin America. Military rule from 1973 to 1985 adversely affected standards in Uruguay. More resources went to military hospitals, which were open only to relatives of the members of the armed forces. Total health care spending in 1984 was 8.1% of GDP, and this included about 7.5% of household spending but 400,000 people had neither state nor private health care coverage. In 1987 there were seven major public hospitals in Montevideo. About half the interior departments had a hospital; the others had a centro auxiliar. Altogether there were about 9,505 hospital beds in the public a monthly membership fee and a small co-payment payable to see a doctor or have a test. There may be age and pre-existing condition guidelines for accepting or not accepting non-employed members. 58.9% of the inhabitants of Montevideo were covered by mutualistas in 1971 and 11.8% had the official health card from the Ministry of Public Health which entitled them to free health care. 16.6% had no coverage of any kind.

The current Uruguayan healthcare system is the State Health Services Administration (ASSE) created in 1987. The National Healthcare Fund (FONASA) is the financial entity responsible for collecting, managing and distributing the money that the state has destined for health in the country. It was created in 2007 to entitle all employees and pensioners to health care outside of the public health system. Latest government figures state that there are 2.5 million people registered with Fonasa – out of a total population of just over 3 million. This would mean that 500,000 Uruguayans are left choosing between the public system or having to pay the full amount for private health care.
