= Healthcare in Georgia (country) =

Healthcare in Georgia is provided by a universal health care system under which the state funds medical treatment in a mainly privatized system of medical facilities. In 2013, the enactment of a universal health care program triggered universal coverage of government-sponsored medical care of the population and improving access to health care services. Responsibility for purchasing publicly financed health services lies with the Social Service Agency (SSA).

The Human Rights Measurement Initiative finds that Georgia is fulfilling 76.3% of what it should be fulfilling for the right to health based on its level of income. When looking at the right to health with respect to children, Georgia achieves 98.1% of what is expected based on its current income. In regards to the right to health amongst the adult population, the country achieves only 86.8% of what is expected based on the nation's level of income. Georgia falls into the "very bad" category when evaluating the right to reproductive health because the nation is fulfilling only 44.0% of what the nation is expected to achieve based on the resources (income) it has available.

== Historical introduction ==
From 1921 to 1991, the Georgian health system was part of the Soviet system. Till 1995 health care system in Georgia was based on Soviet Semashko model. The first dramatic change was implemented in 1995, when the budget transfers were complemented with additional sources of the financing: the mandatory health insurance contributions (employer and the employee mandatory contribution - 3% and 1% respectively), funds allocated for Healthcare from the territorial budgets, official co-payment for medical services, which could not be financed by the state programs.

Mandatory social health insurance was abolished after the 2003-2004 Rose Revolution. In 2003, the social insurance tax was replaced by a social tax, which was accumulated in the state budget and from 2007 the GoG decided to delegate management of state allocations for health insurance for targeted groups of population (the poor, teachers, law enforcement officers and military personnel) who comprised about 40% of the population to private insurance companies, which became the health service purchaser for the mentioned population groups. This meant that a portion of the population could not access health insurance. The state retained control over a few medical facilities dealing with mental illness and infectious diseases, while all other hospitals and clinics were privatized.

Implementation of universal healthcare was a key priority of the Georgian Dream party, which came to power in the 2012 election. It established the current Georgian healthcare system from 2013.

== Current healthcare system ==
Since 2013, there has been a radical change of direction in health financing policy as a new government embraced the move towards universal health coverage rather than targeted benefits.

== Statistical overview of health status ==
=== Life expectancy ===
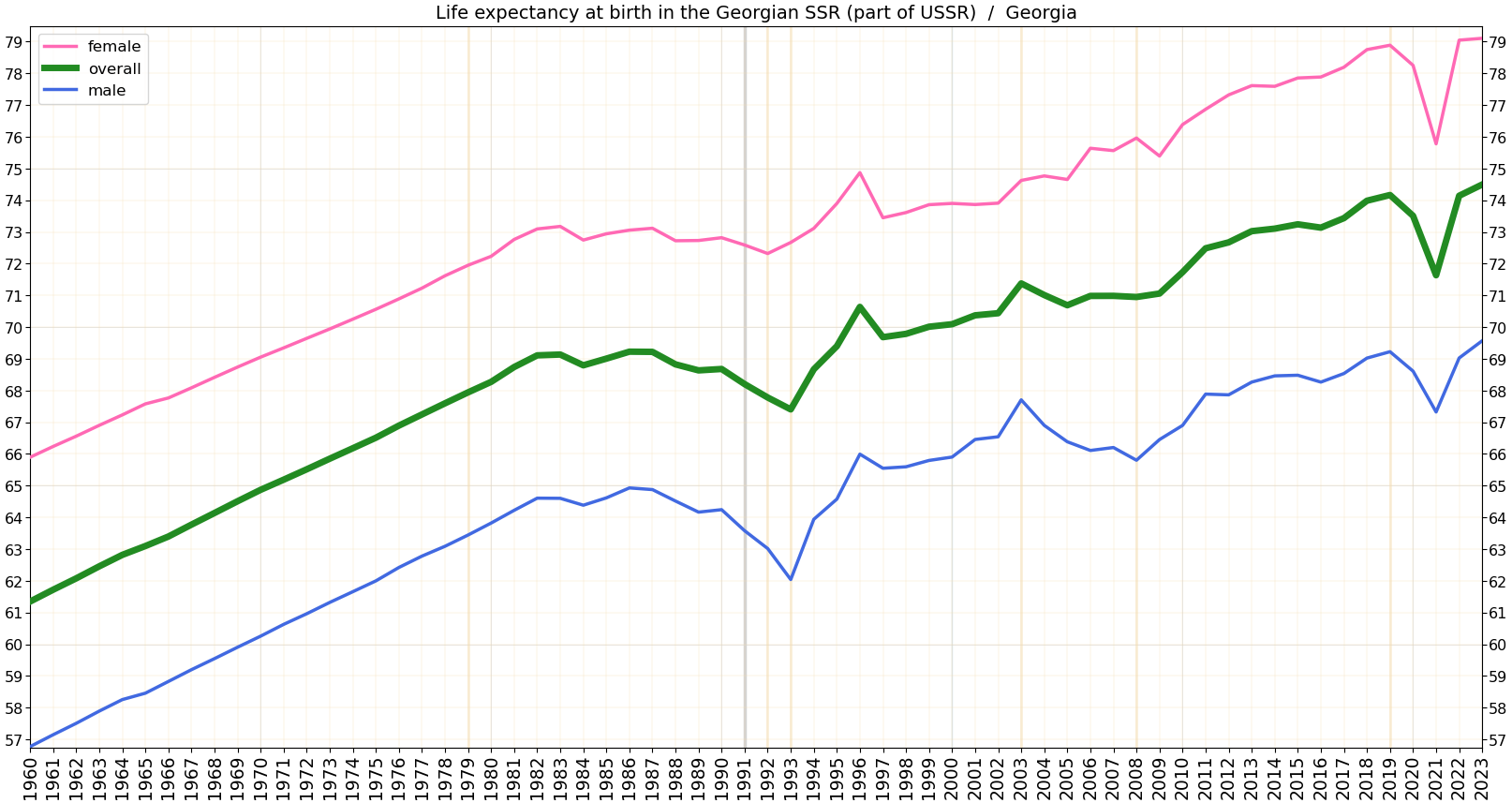
Life expectancy at birth in Georgia

The 2020 average life expectancy in Georgia, estimated by the World Bank Group, was 73.92 years: 69.51 for males and 78.27 for females.

=== Fertility and mortality rates ===
In 2016 the total fertility rate is 2.24 children per woman. Live birth rate is 15.2 per 1000, and mortality rate is 13.7 per 1000. In 2016 infant mortality rate was 9.0 per 1000 live births, and the under-5 mortality rate was 10.7. By 2030, the Maternal mortality rate is expected to drop to 12, and the under-5 mortality rate is expected to drop to 6.0. Maternal mortality is 23.0 per 100,000 live births in 2016. While still high in international comparison, maternal and infant mortality rates have been steadily decreasing.

=== Disease and leading causes of death ===
In Georgia, as with most countries, mortality burden is mostly due to non-communicable diseases. The major causes of death are diseases of the circulatory system, neoplasms, diseases of respiratory system and accidents and injuries. The leading position in the structure of morbidity is associated with Diseases of the respiratory organs, digestive system and circulation system. Infectious diseases are still the source of significant health problems, especially MDR tuberculosis.

== Organizational structure of healthcare ==
=== Regulation ===
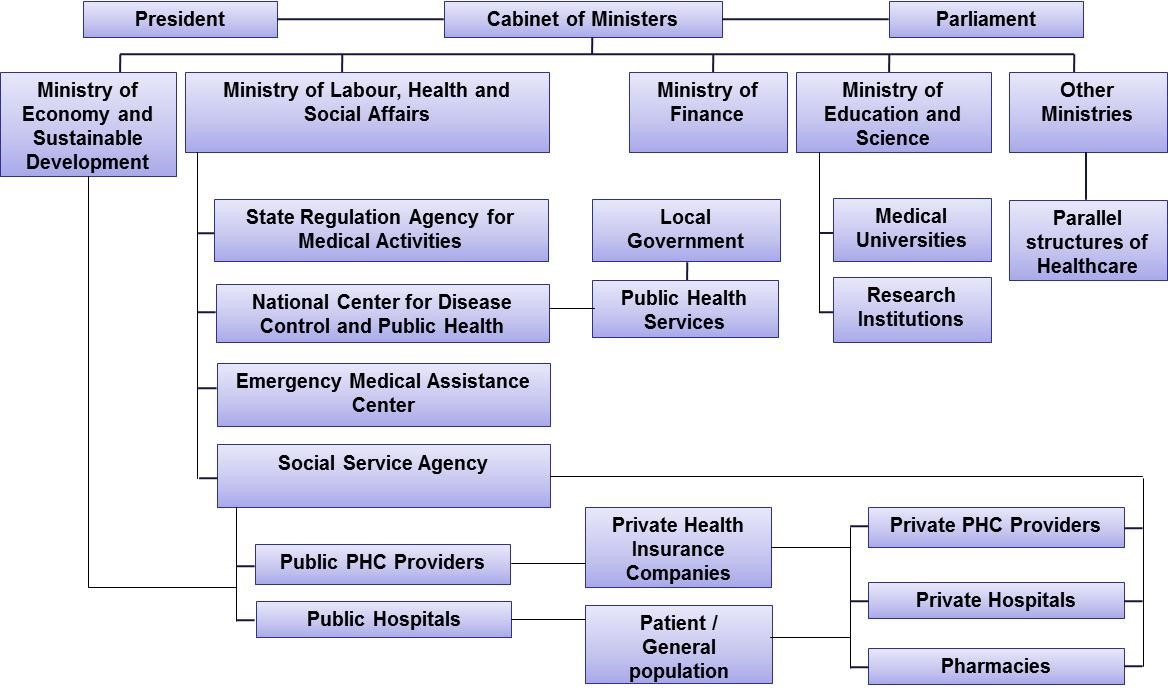
Organizational Struqture of Health care System (MoLHSA)

The health care system in Georgia is highly decentralized and was extensively privatized from 2007 to 2012. Regulations are also very liberal and MoLHSA is now working to ensure the quality of care provided is adequate.

In 2013, the enactment of a universal health care program triggered universal coverage of government-sponsored medical care of the population and improving access to health care services.

In the end of 2014 By Government of Georgia was approved Georgian Healthcare System State Concept 2014-2020 "Universal Healthcare and Quality Management for Protection of Patient Rights", which is a vision of healthcare system development that comprises basics of the sector development in relation to principles and values recognized at international and national levels Ministry of Labour, Health and Social Affairs (MoLHSA) is formally accountable for the health of the population, oversight of the health system, the quality of health services and equity in relation to access to health care throughout the country There are Legal entities under state control of the Ministry: LEPL "Social Service Agency" (SSA), LEPL "National Centre for Disease Control and Public Health" (NCDC), LEPL "State Regulation Agency for Medical Activities (SRAMA) and LEPL Emergency Situations Coordination and Urgent Assistance Center (ESC&UAC). Administration and management of the Health and Social care State Programs including UHC is providing by SSA, which is subordinated institution under the MoLHSA. SSA's territorial offices are located at 68 municipalities and more than 2000 are employed in them

The NCDC is a legal entity of Public Law accountable to the MoLHSA with a dedicated line in the State budget. The NCDC provides national leadership in preventing and controlling communicable and non-communicable diseases through developing national standards and guidelines, health promotion, disease surveillance, immunization, laboratory work, research, providing expert advice, and responding to public health emergencies. SRAMA formally responsible for issuing and control the licenses and permits for health care facilities, regulating medical professionals and pharmaceuticals. ESC&UAC Ensures/coordinates quality emergency medical and referral assistance for improving the state of health of the population during the disaster and martial law situation. ESC&UAC is functioning in all municipalities of the country except in the capital city. By this time 85 medical branches are included. Following extensive privatization and decentralization, most providers in primary and secondary level are private for-profit entities in terms of ownership, governance and management. Many of them are vertically integrated with private health insurance providers and pharmaceutical companies. The development of professional medical associations in Georgia is still at an early stage although there are many of them in existence. Since 2005, the major activity of professional associations has been supporting the MoLHSA in its endeavor to elaborate national clinical practice guidelines and protocols.

Numerous international partners such as WHO, UNICEF, UNFPA, World Bank, USAID, EU, Global Fund, etc. strongly support the health sector in Georgia.

=== Financing ===
Georgia entered the 1990s with a wholly tax-funded healthcare system, but reforms in 1995 replaced this system with a social insurance model run through the State Medical Insurance Company Under the social insurance model, basic healthcare was paid for by the state insurance company, with additional funds coming from Municipal Health Funds and preventative activities provided by the Ministry of Labor, Health, and Social Affairs [2]. In 2003, after the "Rose Revolution" the social insurance tax was replaced by social tax, which was accumulated in the state budget (social tax has been abolished since 2008). Since 2005, state health programs are financed under the budget assignations only.

2007 can be considered as the new phase of the Reform, as the government of Georgia decided to delegate management of state allocations for health insurance for targeted groups of population (the poor, teachers, law enforcement officers and military personnel), to the private insurance companies, which have become the health service purchaser for the mentioned population groups. Therefore, if till 2007 administration of personal health service purchases was carried out by the single payer state agency, from 2007 health care services are partially purchased by private insurance companies, which provided administration of more than half of state resources allocated for state health care programs by 2012.

In February 2013, the Government of Georgia launched the UHC Program, which marked a significant shift in how health care is financed and health services are purchased in Georgia, as well as the culmination of nearly two decades of health system reforms in Georgia. The UHC Program extended publicly financed entitlement to health care coverage to the entire population. The nature of the program is noncontributory, in the sense that Georgians do not have to contribute for enrollment. Enrollment involves registering with the primary care provider of choice. The benefits package covers a range of primary and secondary care services and limited essential drugs. Administratively, the reform transferred responsibility for purchasing health care services from private insurance companies to the SSA under MoLHSA, thus putting in place a platform to shift from passive to active purchasing [11]. The health financing reforms introduced since 2013, and backed up by significant increases in public health spending, have moved Georgia closer to European norms. These include: (i) near universal population entitlement to publicly financed health care; (ii) free visits to family doctors; (iii) referral and prescribing systems; (iv) a single purchasing agency; and (v) higher public spending on health. Sustaining the coverage achieved to date and deepening coverage through better financial protection against OOP costs are the policy priorities for the Government of Georgia. Total health spending in Georgia–at 8.5 percent of GDP in 2015 is much higher than the average for upper-middle-income countries (7.0 percent) and approaching the EU average (10 percent). From 2012 to 2015, the health budget more than doubled, increasing from 5.3 percent to 8.6 percent of total government spending, and as a percentage of GDP from 1.7 percent to 2.9 percent. In this respect, Georgia is experiencing a steep increase in its health sector spending, which is consistent with other middle-income countries’ experience at the time of UHC introduction. Public spending on health in Georgia is mainly drawn from general tax revenues and allocated to the UHC Program and vertical programs, all of which are administered by the SSA. Despite rising public spending on health, OOP remains the dominant source of financing for health in Georgia, filling the void of health spending that is not covered through public sources. OOP spending in Georgia is decreased and estimated to be 57 percent of all health spending (73% in 2012).

== Criticisms ==
There is an extremely high number of doctors per capita in Georgia compared with other European countries, and it had 573.3 physicians per every 100,000 people in 2015. Number of nurses per 100,000 people since 1998 has gone down and is much less than in countries mentioned above (419 per 100,000 people). A ratio of the number of nurses to the number of physicians was equal to 0.7 in 2015.

== Hospitals ==
The number of hospitals was large during the Soviet era. In 1999, there were 246 hospitals in Georgia (or 287 specialized, including specialized institutes) provided 22,491 hospital beds. By 2015, there were 12,830 hospital beds (2014 - 11,675) in the country. The number of beds per 100,000 population was 345.1 (2014 - 313.3), with an occupancy rate of occupancy rate 193.1 (2014 - 188.3), ALOS of 5.3 (2014 - 5.2), and a turnover rate of 36.4 (2014 - 36.3). Following the introduction of the universal health care program, a rapid growth of the admissions was observed in both outpatient and inpatient institutions. Compared to 2012, the hospital service provision for 100,000 population increased by 50%. In 2015 the numbers of encounters of the population with outpatient facilities grows to 4.0 per 1 person (2.1 in 2012).

Notable hospitals in Georgia include the following:

- American Hospital Tbilisi
- Krystyna Kiel Oncology Center
- Batumi Hospital for Infectious Diseases
- Bochorishvili Clinic, Tbilisi
- Cardiology Hospital, Tbilisi
- Clinical Hospital No. 1, Tbilisi
- Clinical Hospital No. 4, Tbilisi
- Clinical Hospital No. 9, Tbilisi
- Clinical Hospital of The Tbilisi I. Javakhishvili State University, Tbilisi
- E. Pipia Public Clinical Hospital, Tbilisi
- Geohospitals, Zestaponi
- Gori Military Hospital, Gori
- Kutaisi Referral Hospital
- Kutaisi Hospital for Infectious Diseases
- Mental Clinical Hospital, Tbilisi
- N. Kipshidze Central Clinical Hospital Of Tbilisi State Medical University, Tbilisi
- N. Barnov Hospital, Tbilisi
- Sachkhere Hospital
- Tbilisi Central Hospital, Tbilisi
- Tbilisi Republican Hospital, Tbilisi
- Tbilisi Hospital for Infectious Diseases
- Tbilisi SEA Hospital
- University Clinic, Tbilisi
- War Veterans Clinical Hospital, Tbilisi
- Zugdidi Referral Hospital
- Zugdidi Hospital for Infectious Diseases

Hospitals in Abkhazia:

- Gagra Central District Hospital, Gagra District, Abkhazia
- Gagra Resort Hospital, Gagra District, Abkhazia
- Gali Central Hospital, Gali District, Abkhazia
- Gudauta Hospital, Gudauta District, Abkhazia
- Sokhumi Hospital, Sokhumi, Abkhazia

Hospitals in South Ossetia

- Republican Tskhinvali hospital, Tskhinvali
- Mobile Hospitals from Russia, established in 2020

== Principal healthcare reforms ==
Major health care reforms and policy measures till 2013 see in the box.

=== Major health care reforms and policy measures ===
- Before 1995 - Semashko model, completely state-funded services
- 1995-2003 - Introduction of social health insurance, mandatory payroll taxes for health and creation of the state health fund (SHF)
- 1999 - National Health Policy developed
- 1999 - MoH and Ministry of Social Affairs merged into MoLHSA
- 2007 - State Hospital Development Master Plan, envisioning a complete change of course in hospital sector based on privatization approved by the Government; Almost of hospitals sold to the private sector
- 2007-2014 - Public Funds given to private insurance companies for the administration of the state health insurance program for the target population (people under poverty line, teachers act.)
- 2009-2010 - Introduction of state voluntary health insurance coverage program
- 2012-2014 - Establishment of state health insurance program for pensioners, children under 5, Students, disability persons
- 2013 - Introduction of Universal health Care program (Phase I-II)
- 2014 - Introduction of prescription system
- 2015 - Introduction of Hepatitis C elimination program
- 2015-2017 - Establishment of perinatal services regionalization
- 2017 - Introduction of State drug program for chronic diseases
- 2017 - Starting of Phase III of Universal health Care program - Service stratification according to revenue groups

Since 2013, the Universal health Care program has been launched, which was commencement of universal access to medical services funded by state for all citizens of Georgia. The Universal health Care program covers the planned outpatient, urgent outpatient-in-patient and planned surgical services, as well as the treatment of oncological diseases and delivery.

The research carried out by the World Bank, the World Health Organization and the US Agency for International Development revealed the main achievements of the Universal health Care Program: increased access to medical services, increased use of medical services, and reduction of financial barriers and expansion of coverage. In the publication of European Health Report 2015 of World Health Organization's European Bureau, Universal Health Care Program in Georgia has been recognized as the successful project. From May 2017 to further reform of the program, it was expedient to elaborate new criteria for differentiation of beneficiaries. The basic object of reform is to provide services more oriented on need and to develop the approach -"social equity". The services package is connected to the income of the population.

From July 1, 2017, for people with chronic illnesses who are registered in the unified database of "socially unprotected families" and their rating score is not exceeding 100 000, have been enacted state program for providing medicines for chronic diseases. The program envisages providing patients with number of medicines for cardiovascular chronic illnesses, lung chronic diseases, diabetes (type 2) and thyroid gland diseases.

On April 21, 2015, Memorandum of Understanding was signed between the company "Gilead" and the Government of Georgia, which laid foundation for the elimination of hepatitis C in Georgia. The services are provided for persons with hepatitis C certifying citizenship of Georgia and persons with neutral travel documents, as well as for accused/convicts placed in penitentiary establishments.

Increased government funding for maternal and child health and ease of access to the high quality health care services played an important role in the reduction of the number of deaths of mothers and children. Georgia has been able to reach the Millennium Development Goal No.4, since in 2015 the mortality rate of children under five was 10.2 per 1000 live birth.

The initiative of starting the perinatal care regionalization process from May 2015 is a significant step forward in strengthening the maternal and newborn health care system, which considers defining the levels of perinatal service providers and their role and responsibilities in order to provide the correct timing of the correct patient to a correct medical institution and, if necessary, effective referral.

== See also ==
- Georgia (country)
- Outline of Georgia (country)
- Politics of Georgia (country)
- Human rights in Georgia
