= Lists of hospitals in Africa =

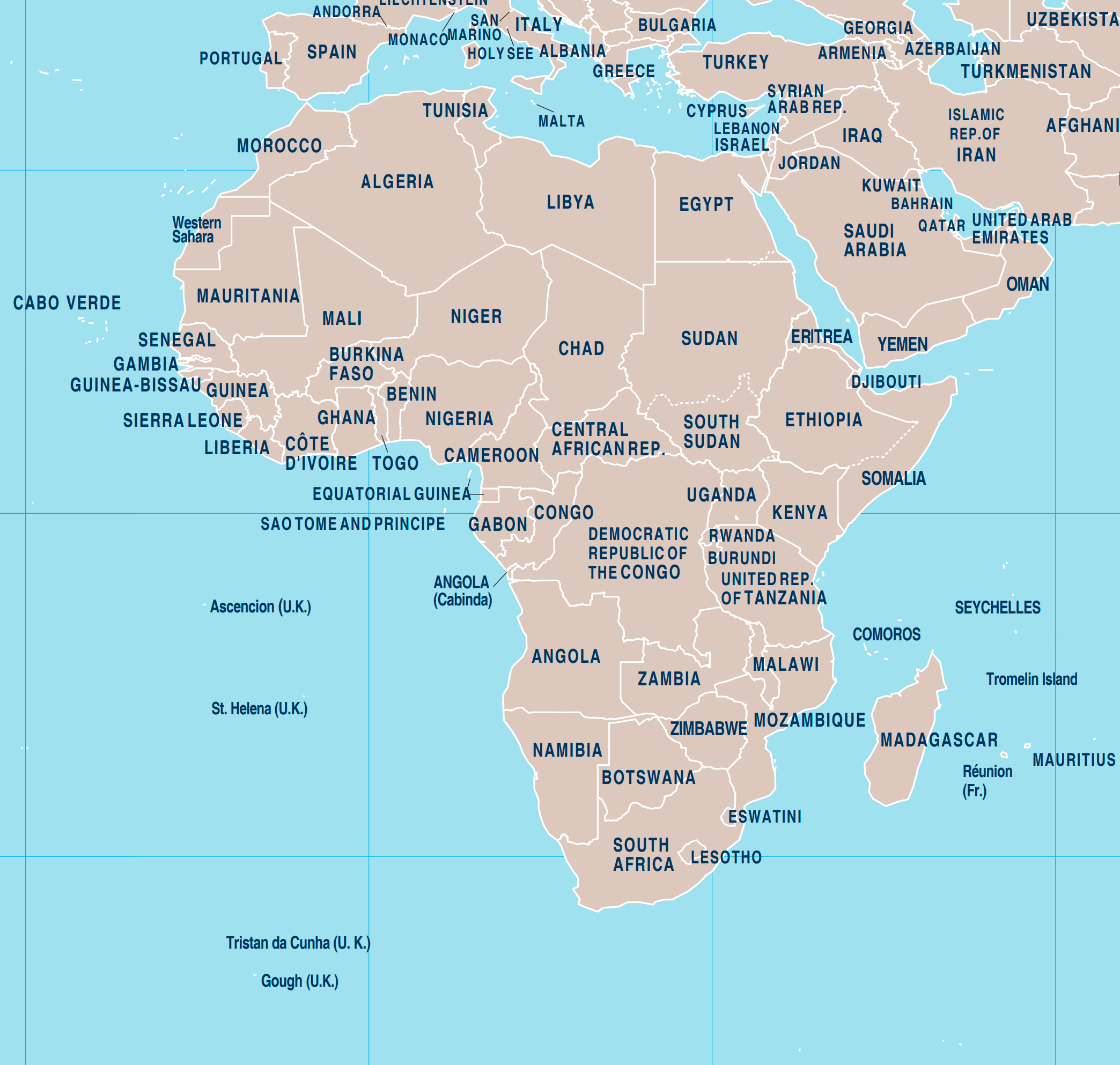

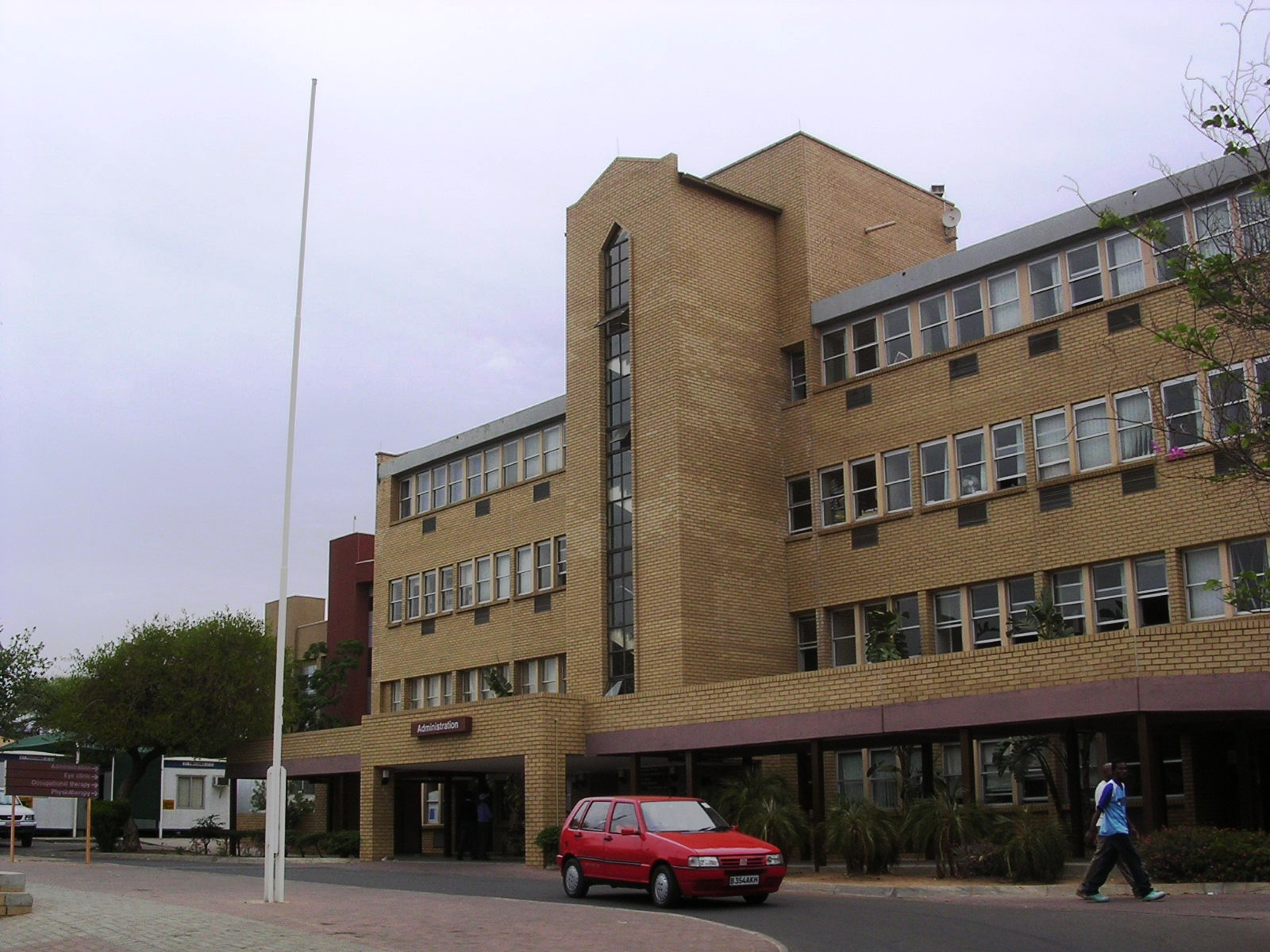
Princess Marina Hospital, Gaborone, Botswana

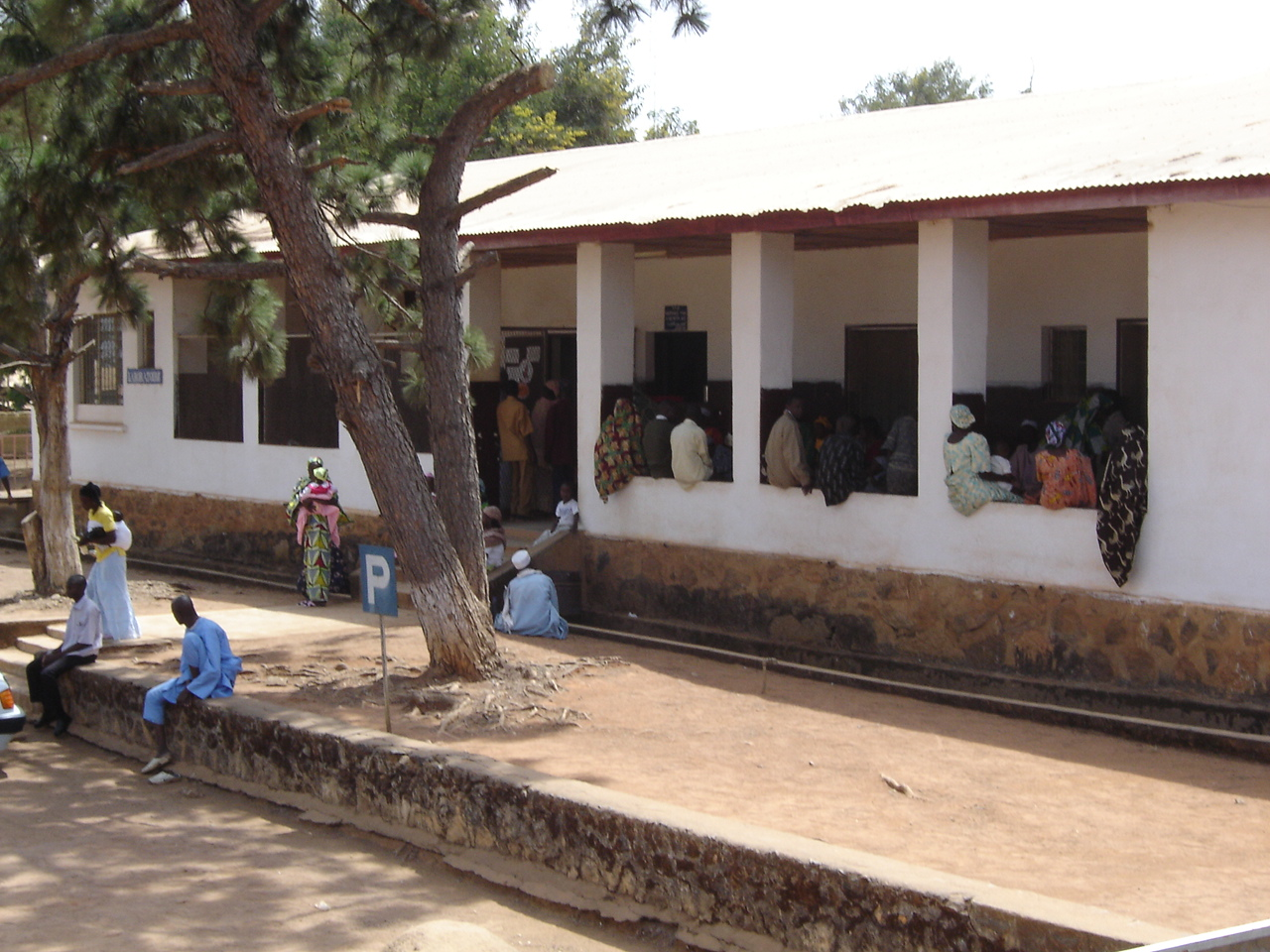
N'Gaoundere Hospital, Cameroon

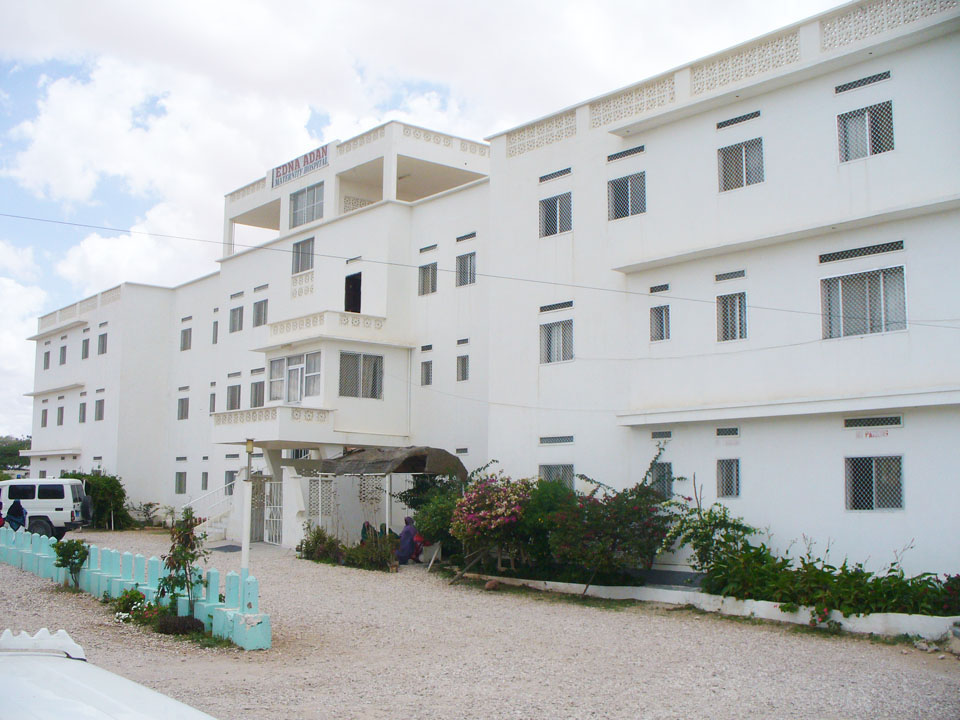
Edna Adan Maternity Hospital, Somaliland

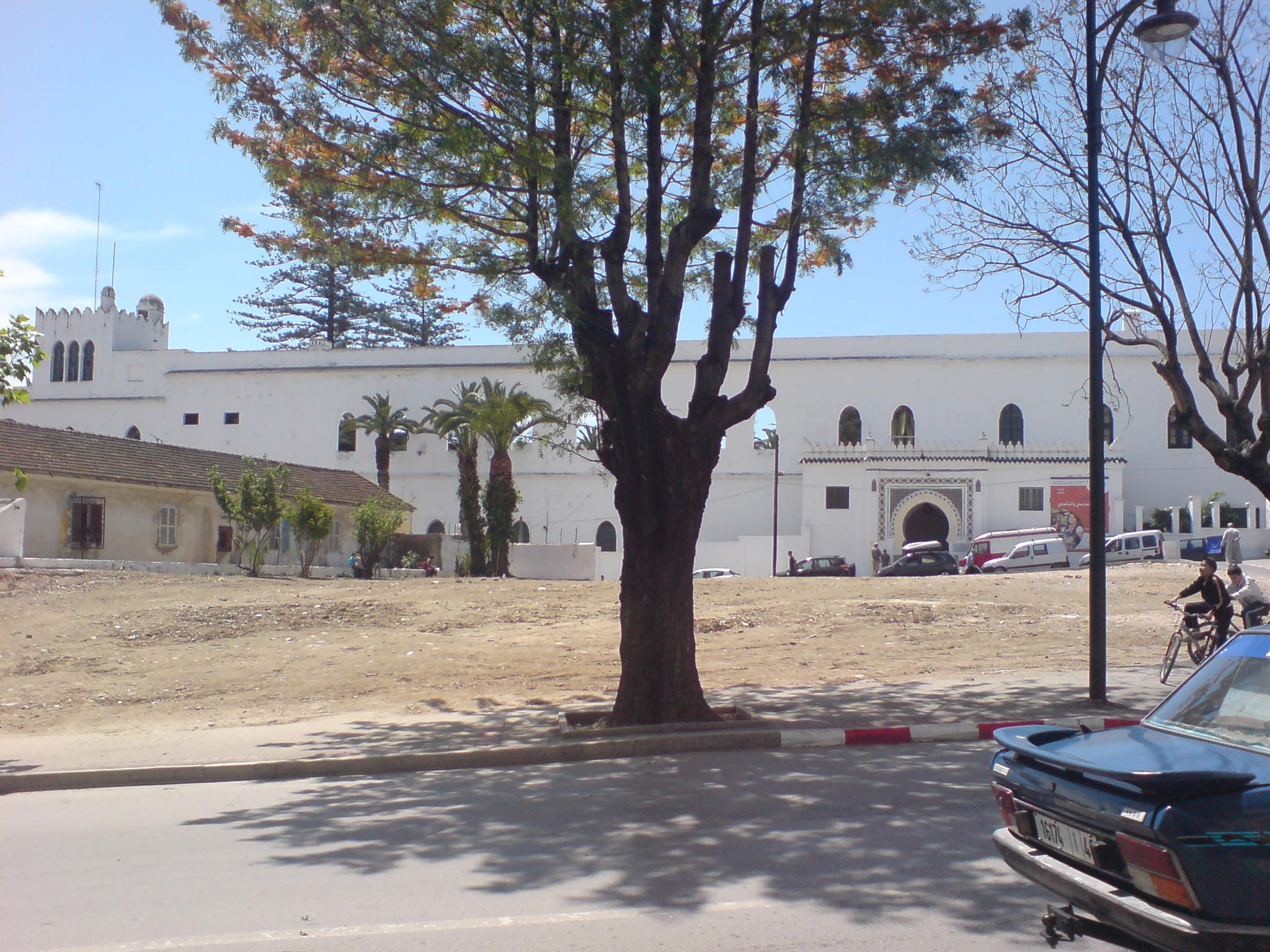
The Solar Hospital Benchimol, Tangiers

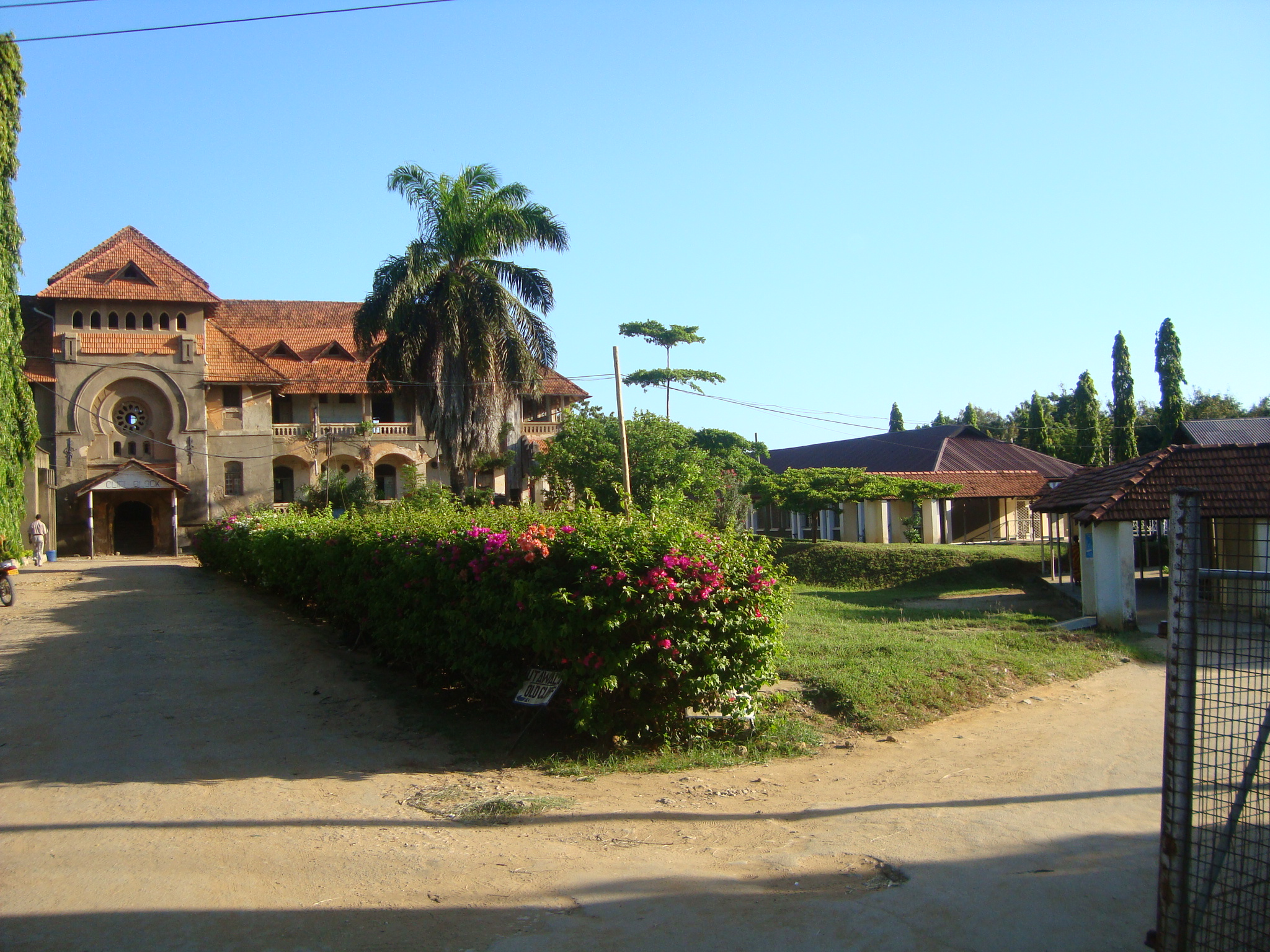
Bombo Hospital, Tanzania

The following are lists of hospitals for each country in Africa:

== Sovereign states ==
In 2018, Nigeria had the largest number of hospitals in sub-Saharan Africa, with 879. Other countries in this region with large numbers of hospitals include Democratic Republic of Congo (435), Kenya (399) and South Africa (337).

The following list shows links to Lists of healthcare and hospital articles where they exist in Wikipedia and categories for hospitals in sovereign states in Africa. The numbers in parentheses are the numbers of current articles in the category for hospitals in each state.

Hospitals in sovereign states of Africa
Country (Healthcare link)	List of hospitals	Category (# articles)	# medical facilities	Population (1,000)
Algeria	List	(6)	313	43,000
Angola	List	(2)	1,575	24,383
Benin	List	(0)	819	10,009
Botswana	List	(17)	624	2,025
Burkina Faso	List	(0)	1,721	18,451
Burundi	List	(7)	665	9,824
Cameroon	List	(7)	3,061	21,918
Cape Verde (Cabo Verde)	List	(0)	66	492
Central African Republic	List	(0)	555	3,859
Chad	List	(0)	1,283	11,040
Comoros	List	(0)	66	806
Democratic Republic of the Congo	List	(6)	14,586	102,561
Republic of the Congo	List	(0)	328	3,697
Djibouti	List	(0)	66	865
Egypt	List	(7)		101,334
Equatorial Guinea	List	(0)	47	1,222
Eritrea	List	(0)	269	6,536
Eswatini (Swaziland)	List	(1)	135	1,119
Ethiopia	List	(14)	5,215	109,224
Gabon	List	(2)	542	1,802
The Gambia	List	(1)	103	1,882
Ghana	List	(36)	1,960	31,072
Guinea	List	(4)	1,746	10,628
Guinea-Bissau	List	(2)	8	1,531
Ivory Coast (Côte d'Ivoire)	List	(0)	1,792	22,671
Kenya	List	(16)	6,146	53,771
Lesotho	List	(7)	117	1,894
Liberia	List	(6)	740	3,477
Libya	List	(2)		5,298
Madagascar	List	(2)	2,677	22,434
Malawi	List	(13)	648	16,833
Mali	List	(0)	1,478	14,529
Mauritania	List	(4)	645	3,719
Mauritius	List	(0)	166	1,261
Morocco	List	(3)		37,035
Mozambique	List	(4)	1,579	28,013
Namibia	List	(9)	369	2,281
Niger	List	(4)	2,886	17,139
Nigeria	List	(49)	20,807	206,140
Rwanda	List	(7)	572	10,516
São Tomé and Príncipe	List	(1)	50	202
Senegal	List	(0)	1,347	14,355
Seychelles	List	(0)	18	91
Sierra Leone	List	(10)	1,120	6,348
Somalia	List	(7)	879	22,317
South Africa	List	(10)	4,303	59,957
South Sudan	List	(5)	1,747	8,260
Sudan	List	(4)	272	42,268
Tanzania	List	(25)	8,497	59,734
Togo	List	(0)	207	6,191
Tunisia	List	(2)		10,983
Uganda	List	(24)	3,792	45,741
Zambia	List	(7)	1,263	15,474
Zimbabwe	List	(15)	1,236	13,061

== States with limited recognition ==
- Sahrawi Arab Democratic Republic List
- Republic of Somaliland List

== Dependencies and other territories ==
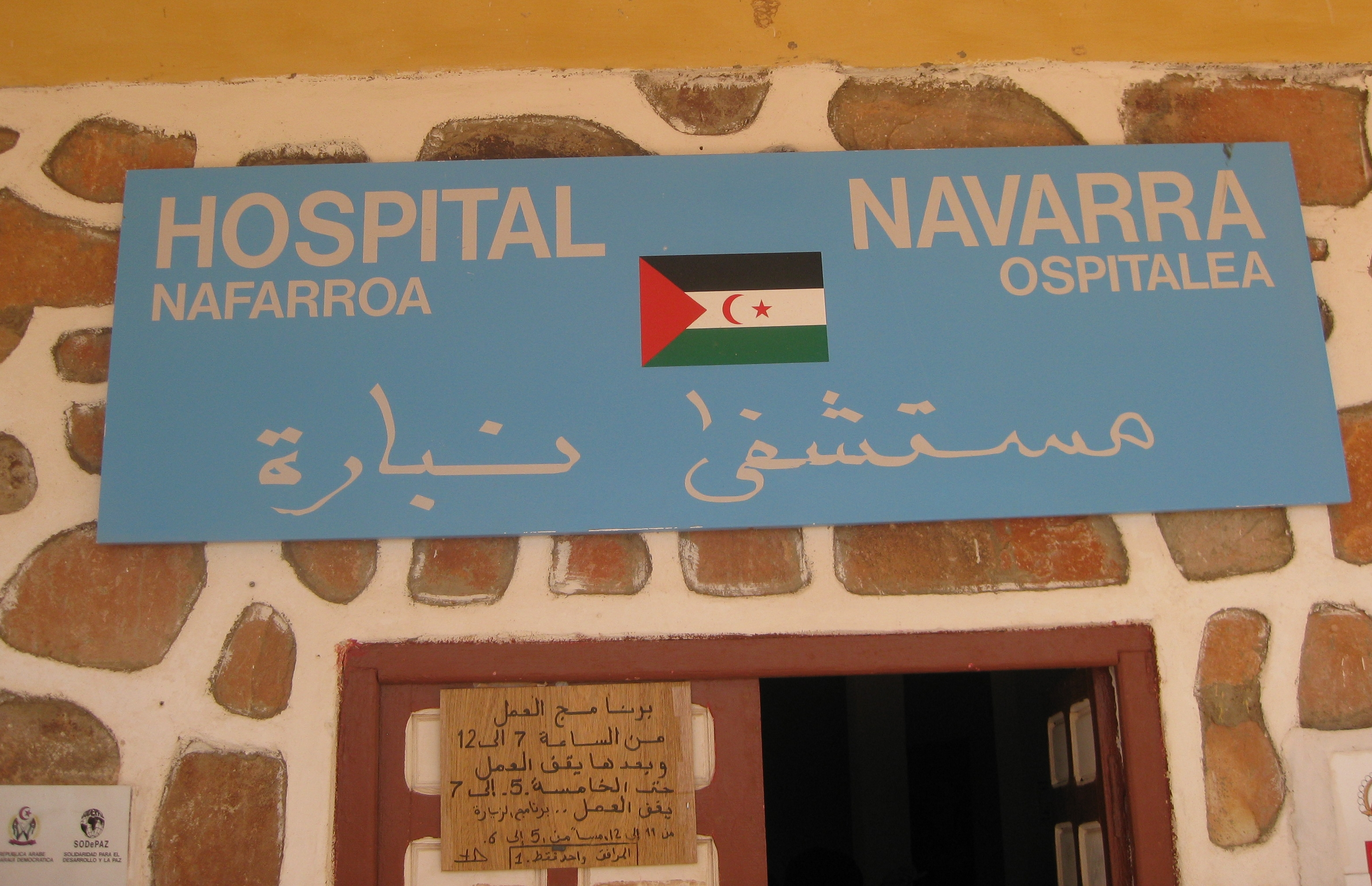
Navarra Hospital sign, Tifariti, Western Sahara

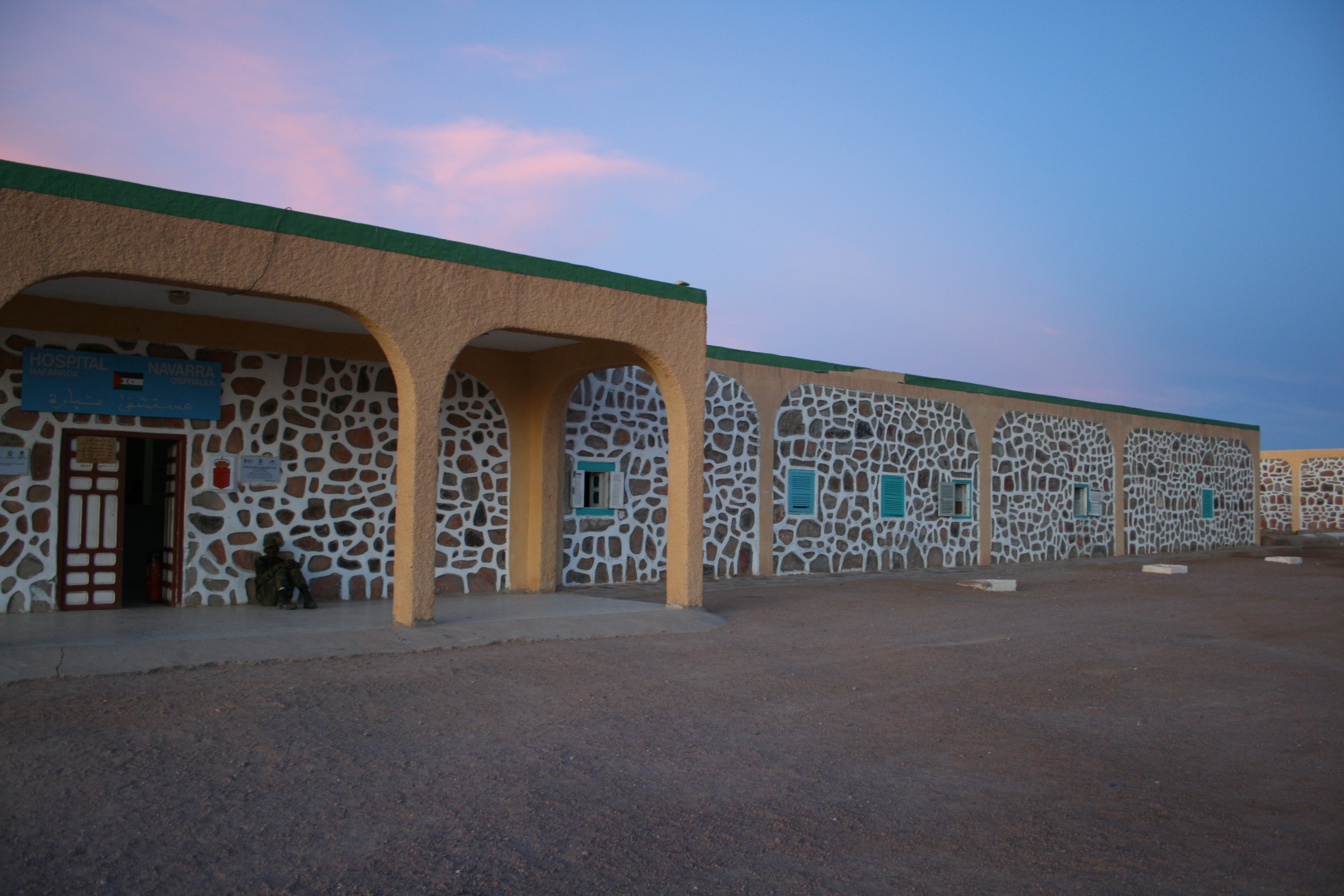
Navarra Hospital, Tifariti, Western Sahara, 3 December 2009

- Canary Islands List (Category 5) (Spain)
- Ceuta List (Autonomous City of Spain)
- Melilla List (autonomous region of Spain)
- Madeira List (autonomous region of Portugal)
- Mayotte List (France)
- Réunion List (France)
- Saint Helena hospital List (United Kingdom), one small 54-bed hospital
- Ascension Island List (United Kingdom)
- Tristan da Cunha List (United Kingdom), no hospitals, only one doctor
- Western Sahara (disputed territory, partially controlled by Sahrawi Arab Democratic Republic)
  - Navarra Hospital, Tifariti
  - Hospital Moulay Hassane Ben Mehdi, Laayoune
  - 4eme Military Hospital, Dakhla
- Zanzibar (Autonomous Region of Tanzania), List 145 medical facilities

== See also ==
- Lists of hospitals in Asia
- Lists of hospitals in Europe
- Lists of hospitals in North America
- Lists of hospitals in Oceania
- Lists of hospitals in South America
