= List of countries by body mass index =

Countries by BMI: >30 28.1–30.0 27.1–28.0 26.1–27.0 23.1–25.0 22.1–23.0 <22.0 No data

The data for mean body mass index by country was published by the World Health Organization. The list below refers to year 2014.

== Data ==
* indicates "Health in COUNTRY or TERRITORY" links.

Mean BMI (kg/m^{2}), World Health Organization (WHO), 2014
Country	Both	Male	Female
Nauru *	32.5	32.1	32.8
Tonga *	31.9	30.4	33.5
Samoa *	31.7	29.9	33.5
Kuwait *	30.0	29.5	30.8
Saint Kitts and Nevis *	29.7	28.4	30.9
Saint Lucia *	29.6	28.9	30.2
Kiribati *	29.6	28.7	30.5
Palau	29.4	29.4	29.5
Federated States of Micronesia *	29.4	27.8	31.0
Tuvalu *	29.3	28.7	29.9
Qatar *	29.2	29.0	30.1
Marshall Islands *	29.2	28.4	30.0
Egypt *	29.2	27.6	30.7
United Arab Emirates *	29.0	28.6	29.7
Jordan *	28.9	28.2	29.7
Belize *	28.9	27.6	30.2
Bahamas	28.8	28.0	29.6
Trinidad and Tobago *	28.7	27.9	29.4
Barbados *	28.7	27.4	30.0
United States *	28.8	28.8	28.8
Saudi Arabia *	28.5	28.3	28.7
Libya *	28.4	27.2	29.6
Bahrain *	28.2	28.0	28.6
Mexico *	28.1	27.5	28.7
Antigua and Barbuda *	28.4	27.3	29.5
Syria *	28.1	27.2	29.0
Iraq *	28.0	27.2	28.8
New Zealand *	27.9	28.0	27.8
Lebanon *	27.8	28.0	27.6
Chile *	27.8	27.6	28.0
Turkey *	27.8	27.1	28.5
Argentina *	27.7	27.8	27.5
Ireland *	27.5	27.9	27.1
Andorra *	27.5	27.8	27.1
Kazakhstan *	27.4	27.4	27.5
El Salvador *	27.4	26.8	28.0
Azerbaijan *	27.4	26.6	28.1
Suriname *	27.4	26.5	28.2
Jamaica *	27.4	25.5	29.2
United Kingdom *	27.3	27.5	27.1
Greece *	27.3	27.4	27.2
Saint Vincent and the Grenadines *	27.3	26.5	28.1
South Africa *	27.3	25.4	29.1
Australia *	27.2	27.6	26.8
Canada *	27.2	27.6	26.8
Malta *	27.2	27.5	26.8
Venezuela *	27.2	27.4	27.1
Georgia *	27.2	27.2	27.3
Fiji *	27.2	26.1	28.4
Panama *	27.1	26.4	27.7
Cyprus *	27.0	27.6	26.3
Ecuador *	27.0	26.4	27.7
Grenada *	27.0	25.2	28.7
Dominica *	27.0	25.1	29.0
Czech Republic *	26.9	27.8	26.0
Slovenia *	26.9	27.5	26.3
Oman *	26.9	26.8	27.1
Costa Rica *	26.9	26.7	27.1
Nicaragua *	26.9	26.0	27.8
Uruguay *	26.8	26.7	26.9
Tunisia *	26.8	26.0	27.5
Seychelles *	26.8	25.6	28.0
Spain *	26.7	27.4	26.0
Moldova *	26.7	26.3	27.1
Dominican Republic *	26.7	26.0	27.4
Armenia *	26.7	25.9	27.4
Lithuania *	26.6	27.3	26.0
Belarus *	26.6	27.1	26.2
Eswatini *	26.5	24.1	28.9
Luxembourg *	26.5	27.6	25.5
Slovakia *	26.5	27.4	25.7
Russia *	26.5	26.1	26.8
Guatemala *	26.5	25.8	27.1
Poland *	26.4	27.0	25.7
Turkmenistan *	26.4	26.4	26.4
Honduras *	26.4	25.5	27.3
Guyana *	26.3	25.0	27.6
Hungary *	26.3	27.5	25.2
Germany *	26.3	27.0	25.6
Israel *	26.3	26.3	26.2
Peru *	26.3	25.7	26.9
Iran *	26.2	25.3	27.2
Portugal *	26.2	26.7	25.7
Brunei *	26.2	25.8	26.6
Cuba *	26.2	25.6	26.7
Kyrgyzstan *	26.2	25.6	26.8
Vanuatu *	26.2	25.6	26.8
Algeria *	26.2	25.5	27.0
Albania *	26.1	26.6	25.6
Bosnia and Herzegovina *	26.1	26.5	25.7
Uzbekistan *	26.1	25.9	26.3
Mongolia *	26.0	25.5	26.4
Norway *	26.0	26.9	25.2
Bulgaria *	26.0	26.7	25.3
Montenegro *	26.0	26.5	25.5
Ukraine *	26.0	26.4	25.8
Bolivia *	25.9	24.6	27.3
Colombia *	25.9	25.4	26.5
Brazil *	25.9	25.9	26.0
Iceland *	25.9	26.7	25.1
Finland *	25.9	26.5	25.3
Yemen *	25.8	25.2	26.5
Paraguay *	25.8	25.6	26.0
Latvia *	25.8	26.8	25.1
Sweden *	25.8	26.7	24.9
Serbia *	25.8	26.4	25.2
North Macedonia *	25.8	26.4	25.3
Mauritius *	25.6	25.0	26.2
Equatorial Guinea *	25.6	25.0	26.1
Morocco *	25.6	25.2	25.9
Gabon *	25.5	24.6	26.4
Solomon Islands *	25.5	24.5	26.4
Belgium *	25.5	26.2	24.7
Estonia *	25.5	27.0	24.3
Croatia *	25.5	26.5	24.6
Tajikistan *	25.4	25.5	25.3
Netherlands *	25.4	25.9	25.0
Austria *	25.4	26.5	24.4
Papua New Guinea *	25.3	25.0	25.6
Malaysia *	25.3	25.0	25.6
Romania *	25.3	25.7	24.9
Denmark *	25.3	26.0	24.5
France *	25.3	26.1	24.6
Italy *	25.3	26.1	24.5
Switzerland *	25.3	26.7	23.8
South Sudan *	25.2	23.7	26.7
Sudan *	25.2	23.7	26.7
Maldives *	25.1	24.2	25.9
Lesotho *	24.9	22.7	27.1
Mauritania *	24.8	23.2	26.4
São Tomé and Príncipe *	24.8	23.9	25.6
Botswana *	24.7	22.9	26.6
Cape Verde *	24.7	23.9	25.4
Cameroon *	24.4	23.8	25.1
Namibia *	24.3	22.9	25.6
Ghana *	24.2	23.4	25.1
Comoros *	24.1	23.0	25.1
Thailand *	24.1	23.6	24.6
Angola *	24.1	23.5	24.6
Haiti *	24.1	24.2	24.0
Gambia	24.0	23.0	25.1
Liberia *	24.0	23.2	24.9
China *	23.9	24.2	23.6
South Korea *	23.9	24.3	23.4
Pakistan *	23.8	23.3	24.4
Bhutan *	23.8	23.4	24.2
Singapore *	23.7	24.3	23.2
Ivory Coast *	23.6	23.2	24.1
Zimbabwe *	23.4	21.8	24.5
Benin *	23.4	22.6	24.3
Nigeria *	23.4	22.8	24.0
Congo *	23.3	22.5	24.1
Djibouti *	23.3	22.7	23.9
Togo *	23.2	22.4	24.0
Philippines *	23.2	22.9	23.4
Guinea-Bissau *	23.1	22.2	23.9
Tanzania *	23.1	22.2	24.0
Senegal *	23.0	21.8	24.1
Kenya *	23.0	21.9	24.0
Sri Lanka *	23.0	22.5	23.5
Indonesia *	22.9	22.4	23.4
Sierra Leone *	22.8	22.0	23.6
Malawi *	22.8	22.3	23.3
Mali *	22.8	22.6	23.0
Guinea *	22.7	22.1	23.3
Zambia *	22.6	21.5	23.8
Myanmar *	22.6	22.1	23.2
Laos *	22.6	22.4	22.7
Japan *	22.6	23.6	21.7
Central African Republic *	22.4	21.6	23.2
Mozambique *	22.3	21.6	23.0
Chad *	22.3	22.1	22.5
DR Congo *	22.2	21.8	22.5
Nepal *	22.2	22.4	22.0
Burkina Faso *	22.1	22.1	22.0
Uganda *	22.0	21.0	23.0
Rwanda *	22.0	21.3	22.7
Somalia *	21.9	21.2	22.5
India *	21.9	21.8	22.1
Cambodia *	21.9	21.9	22.0
North Korea *	21.8	21.9	21.8
Niger *	21.7	21.3	22.2
Vietnam *	21.6	21.5	21.6
Afghanistan *	21.6	21.5	21.8
Timor-Leste *	21.2	21.5	21.0
Madagascar *	21.1	20.9	21.2
Bangladesh *	21.0	20.7	21.2
Burundi *	20.9	20.4	21.3
Ethiopia *	20.6	20.2	21.0
Eritrea *	20.5	20.1	21.0

== See also ==
- List of countries by obesity rate
