= List of countries by maternal mortality ratio =

Maternal mortality ratio

Maternal mortality ratio vs mean daily income

From Our World in Data (using World Health Organization definition): "The maternal mortality ratio (MMR) is defined as the number of maternal deaths during a given time period per 100,000 live births during the same time period. It depicts the risk of maternal death relative to the number of live births and essentially captures the risk of death in a single pregnancy or a single live birth. Maternal deaths: The annual number of female deaths from any cause related to or aggravated by pregnancy or its management (excluding accidental or incidental causes) during pregnancy and childbirth or within 42 days of termination of pregnancy, irrespective of the duration and site of the pregnancy, expressed per 100,000 live births, for a specified time period. (ICD-10)." See the reference for a detailed definition of a live birth. See International Classification of Diseases (ICD-10). The global rate is 224 maternal deaths per 100,000 live births in 2020 (latest available year for some countries).

== Table ==
There are later years at the source for this table.

- Note: Year listed indicates latest available data as of that year. Year can vary by country.
- Row numbers are static. Other columns are sortable. This allows ranking of any column.

Asterisk (*) indicates "Healthcare in LOCATION" or "Health in LOCATION" links.

Maternal mortality ratio per 100,000 live births.
Location	2020	2010	2000	1985
Afghanistan *	620.4	898.7	1,346.1	1,910.3
Africa (WHO)	531.5	647.4	788.1	1,007.1
Albania *	8.3	8.5	14.3	47.7
Algeria *	77.7	111.7	159.2	255.6
Americas (WHO)	68.0	59.9	68.4	147.8
Angola *	221.9	367.3	859.9	1,098.0
Antigua and Barbuda	21.2	30.8	51.3	59.0
Argentina *	44.9	55.1	71.5	97.9
Armenia *	27.2	33.2	50.2	54.0
Australia *	2.9	5.5	6.7	8.0
Austria *	5.2	6.0	6.4	10.5
Azerbaijan *	40.8	32.8	55.5	52.8
Bahamas	77.1	78.9	60.8	55.6
Bahrain *	15.9	19.8	24.3	37.0
Bangladesh *	123.0	300.8	441.2	907.5
Barbados	39.1	53.3	48.4	52.7
Belarus *	1.1	2.7	24.3	42.3
Belgium *	4.8	5.9	8.3	8.5
Belize *	129.8	32.7	85.9	113.8
Benin *	522.6	598.2	469.3	718.7
Bhutan *	59.9	116.6	304.7	835.1
Bolivia *	160.9	184.1	284.0	586.5
Bosnia and Herzegovina *	5.7	7.7	15.6	47.4
Botswana *	185.9	155.9	181.6	228.8
Brazil *	72.1	63.9	68.4	227.0
Brunei *	44.2	41.8	49.5	58.4
Bulgaria *	7.1	10.3	21.9	25.4
Burkina Faso *	263.8	357.4	505.6	795.3
Burundi *	494.4	608.0	873.6	1,343.3
Cambodia *	218.0	276.4	605.6	687.8
Cameroon *	437.8	526.7	650.7	694.3
Canada *	11.0	11.9	9.3	7.0
Cape Verde *	42.2	53.9	125.1	399.8
Central African Republic *	835.3	1,051.6	1,315.2	1,003.1
Chad *	1,063.5	1,303.3	1,365.5	1,420.0
Chile *	15.0	23.4	32.6	75.5
China *	23.0	33.2	58.1	114.5
Colombia *	74.8	70.6	92.6	130.0
Comoros *	217.0	316.2	455.7	656.2
Congo *	282.4	389.1	659.8	630.6
Costa Rica *	22.0	26.6	38.5	49.6
Ivory Coast *	479.9	604.1	473.5	667.0
Croatia *	4.8	7.2	10.9	12.9
Cuba *	39.3	41.1	47.0	69.1
Cyprus *	68.4	26.8	33.2	38.2
Czech Republic *	3.4	4.3	8.0	13.1
DR Congo *	547.4	601.5	667.7	1,171.5
Denmark *	4.7	6.5	8.0	11.5
Djibouti *	234.5	273.8	512.5	707.2
Dominican Republic *	107.3	91.8	79.1	154.1
Timor-Leste *	203.9	376.3	749.7	1,671.8
Eastern Mediterranean (WHO)	179.2	231.5	355.9	414.4
Ecuador *	65.7	76.2	120.1	238.6
Egypt *	16.8	38.2	79.4	152.8
El Salvador	42.8	35.8	48.8	210.5
Equatorial Guinea *	212.3	211.3	426.6	1,302.5
Eritrea *	321.6	479.7	734.6	1,557.6
Estonia *	5.2	8.1	24.8	49.1
Eswatini *	239.6	671.5	588.3	484.3
Ethiopia *	266.7	634.7	952.8	1,297.3
Europe (WHO)	13.2	15.4	26.3	56.2
Fiji	38.0	41.6	49.0	64.9
Finland *	8.3	7.0	7.5	5.6
France *	7.9	9.3	9.4	18.3
Gabon *	226.6	192.9	248.5	450.6
Gambia	458.2	619.8	777.7	1,202.2
Georgia *	27.6	41.0	52.8	44.3
Germany *	4.4	6.2	7.2	10.3
Ghana *	263.1	336.9	498.9	848.0
Greece *	7.7	3.4	3.8	7.3
Grenada	21.1	27.3	42.1	53.9
Guatemala	95.5	123.3	151.8	267.6
Guinea *	553.4	740.7	970.9	1,238.3
Guinea-Bissau *	725.1	794.5	1,300.2	1,651.9
Guyana *	111.9	147.9	190.1	275.1
Haiti *	350.4	402.9	399.7	710.4
Honduras *	71.8	73.2	81.9	223.6
Hungary *	15.0	15.0	14.6	25.4
Iceland *	2.7	2.9	5.3	6.8
India *	102.7	178.7	384.4	646.9
Indonesia *	172.9	218.8	298.6	495.3
Iran *	22.0	31.6	43.5	102.3
Iraq *	76.1	114.9	116.9	201.9
Ireland *	5.0	6.5	10.4	11.1
Israel *	2.8	3.0	8.6	40.3
Italy *	4.6	6.7	10.1	18.1
Jamaica	98.9	87.7	83.0	45.1
Japan *	4.3	5.7	8.5	17.4
Jordan *	41.3	46.6	64.3	96.3
Kazakhstan *	13.4	19.6	56.3	99.8
Kenya *	530.0	475.5	563.8	580.1
Kiribati *	76.3	130.6	115.9	213.2
Kuwait *	7.2	9.2	9.9	13.2
Kyrgyzstan *	50.4	71.7	86.9	97.0
Laos *	126.1	283.6	579.2	878.0
Latvia *	18.3	25.4	32.0	50.4
Lebanon *	20.6	18.0	31.9	66.9
Lesotho *	566.2	1,040.2	544.6	565.3
Liberia *	652.3	634.2	777.4	1,365.4
Libya *	72.1	57.5	56.7	57.5
Lithuania *	8.7	9.7	17.5	31.1
Luxembourg *	6.5	8.3	9.3	12.6
Madagascar *	391.5	496.8	658.1	810.4
Malawi *	380.7	512.9	573.5	891.8
Malaysia *	21.1	25.5	39.7	55.1
Maldives *	56.7	59.8	114.3	364.6
Mali *	440.2	546.8	742.3	1,341.2
Malta *	2.9	5.3	10.5	16.2
Mauritania *	463.8	586.1	683.6	781.3
Mauritius *	84.4	55.1	52.2	141.7
Mexico *	59.1	51.2	56.5	97.2
Federated States of Micronesia	74.3	45.7	60.1	112.0
Moldova *	12.3	18.1	48.9	75.2
Mongolia *	39.5	65.5	157.8	211.5
Montenegro *	6.2	7.2	10.5	10.7
Morocco *	71.9	133.9	244.2	673.7
Mozambique *	127.1	321.5	532.1	1,240.3
Myanmar *	178.7	292.7	371.4	572.5
Namibia *	214.6	481.6	450.3	328.4
Nepal *	174.4	349.2	504.0	1,171.5
Netherlands *	4.3	6.3	13.0	11.4
New Zealand *	7.0	9.9	11.1	16.9
Nicaragua *	77.9	97.8	168.8	269.9
Niger *	441.1	593.9	866.8	1,128.7
Nigeria *	1,047.2	1,122.7	1,147.5	1,283.0
North Korea *	106.7	130.2	185.6	115.1
North Macedonia *	3.0	6.3	12.3	17.9
Norway *	1.7	4.0	5.7	7.0
Oman *	17.0	18.1	19.8	31.1
Pakistan *	154.2	230.5	387.4	368.1
Palestine *	20.4	43.4	62.0	110.3
Panama *	49.5	54.9	65.5	87.9
Papua New Guinea	191.8	288.9	311.9	354.3
Paraguay *	71.1	100.5	148.5	251.9
Peru *	68.5	76.4	113.3	274.0
Philippines *	78.2	105.0	129.0	255.9
Poland *	2.0	2.5	7.8	17.5
Portugal *	11.8	9.9	10.8	15.6
Puerto Rico *	34.3	21.2	21.9	31.8
Qatar *	7.6	10.1	28.1	23.9
Romania *	10.1	22.2	50.2	212.4
Russia *	13.7	17.2	52.3	106.8
Rwanda *	258.9	385.8	1,006.5	952.1
Saint Lucia *	73.3	73.3	86.7	48.6
Saint Vincent and the Grenadines	61.8	44.6	76.4	77.8
Samoa	59.1	61.6	74.5	116.4
São Tomé and Príncipe *	146.2	160.2	179.5	257.0
Saudi Arabia *	16.2	15.3	21.5	35.8
Senegal *	260.9	450.1	638.4	760.0
Serbia *	10.2	14.2	17.8	16.9
Seychelles *	3.3	8.2	44.3	56.8
Sierra Leone *	442.8	837.4	1,682.4	1,427.5
Singapore *	7.5	8.3	15.1	17.7
Slovakia *	4.8	5.1	8.6	9.8
Slovenia *	4.5	6.0	11.9	16.0
Solomon Islands *	122.2	147.1	150.1	179.2
Somalia *	620.7	963.2	1,096.9	1,199.0
South Africa *	126.8	219.1	173.0	168.0
South Korea *	8.1	8.2	15.5	39.3
South Sudan *	1,222.5	1,059.8	1,686.6	3,291.8
South-East Asia (WHO)	116.8	197.4	372.0	643.8
Spain *	3.4	3.9	5.0	5.9
Sri Lanka *	28.8	37.3	61.1	69.8
Sudan *	270.4	383.4	642.2	1,165.5
Suriname *	96.5	138.3	278.2	415.5
Sweden *	4.5	4.5	6.1	7.2
Switzerland *	7.4	8.1	7.9	9.7
Syria *	29.9	21.3	33.7	55.6
Tajikistan *	16.6	31.9	67.5	113.6
Tanzania *	238.3	485.9	760.1	843.9
Thailand *	28.6	35.3	48.2	77.6
Togo *	399.0	530.3	479.3	680.0
Tonga *	125.6	93.2	94.1	129.0
Trinidad and Tobago *	26.6	46.8	73.9	108.9
Tunisia *	36.6	43.9	61.5	124.7
Turkey *	17.3	22.1	31.7	53.2
Turkmenistan *	5.1	8.8	26.1	94.0
Uganda *	284.1	372.0	461.5	757.2
Ukraine *	16.5	16.9	35.8	66.2
United Arab Emirates *	9.3	9.2	21.8	21.6
United Kingdom *	9.8	9.5	11.0	8.4
United States *	21.1	14.1	11.8	10.7
Uruguay *	18.6	17.8	26.6	48.6
Uzbekistan *	30.2	37.8	42.6	92.9
Vanuatu *	94.4	93.1	108.7	161.1
Venezuela *	259.2	112.2	92.4	105.4
Vietnam *	45.5	60.0	88.5	143.2
Western Pacific (WHO)	44.3	49.1	76.4	131.0
World	223.5	253.8	339.0	441.3
Yemen *	183.4	156.6	275.0	466.1
Zambia *	134.7	268.5	418.7	555.4
Zimbabwe *	356.8	618.3	387.8	431.5

== See also ==
- Health system
- Health care systems by country
- Maternal mortality in the United States
- List of countries by hospital beds
- List of countries by life expectancy
- List of countries by infant and under-five mortality rates
- List of OECD health expenditure by country by type of financing
- List of countries by total health expenditure per capita
- Health spending as a percent of GDP by country (gross domestic product)
