= Health in Somalia =

Somalia's health care system is significantly underdeveloped. The following information provides an overview of the state of health in Somalia, with data sourced from the CIA World Factbook.

Population: 12.3 million (2014 est.)

Age structure

0–14 years: 45.6% (male 2,881,283/female 2,740,209)
15–64 years: 52.5% (male 3,219,425/female 3,226,432)
65 years and over: 2% (male 144,056/female 105,407) (2014 est.)

Population growth rate: 3.8% (2014 est.)

Birth rate: 40.87 births/1,000 population (2014 est.)

Death rate: 13.91 deaths/1,000 population (2014 est.)

Sex ratio

at birth: 0.894 male(s)/female
under 15 years: 1 male(s)/female
15–64 years: 1.07 male(s)/female
65 years and over: 0.66 male(s)/female
total population: 1.028 male(s)/female (2014 est.)

Infant mortality rate

100.4 deaths/1,000 live births (2012 est.)
male: 108.89 deaths/1,000 live births
female: 92.12 deaths/1,000 live births (2014 est.)

Life expectancy at birth

Life expectancy at birth in Somalia

total population: 51.8 years
male: 49.58 years
female: 53.65 years (2014 est.)

Total fertility rate

6.08 children born/woman (2014 est.)

HIV/AIDS

HIV/AIDS - adult prevalence rate: 0.5% (2009 est.) HIV/AIDS - people living with HIV/AIDS: 31,200 (2009 est.) HIV/AIDS - deaths: 2,500 (2009 est.)

Major infectious diseases

degree of risk: high
food or waterborne diseases: bacterial and protozoal diarrhea, hepatitis A and E, and typhoid fever
vectorborne diseases: dengue fever, malaria, and Rift Valley fever
water contact disease: schistosomiasis
animal contact disease: rabies (2009)
