= Healthcare in Saint Helena =

Healthcare in Saint Helena is provided by the Health Directorate on the British island of Saint Helena, which has a staff of about 250. In 1957, two medical officers and a dentist were part of the colony's establishment.

== Facilities ==
The directorate manages a small general hospital with 54 beds, a dispensary, a complex for care of the elderly, centres for the acute and chronically mentally infirm, and the mentally and physically handicapped. There are several outpatient clinics, a pharmacy and laboratory, and dental care. There are six rural health clinics which are visited regularly by the doctors, dentist, and community nurses. The resident staff include a senior medical officer, three medical officers and a dentist, with annual visits by an optometrist and ophthalmic surgeon.

In 2006, the service had a portable x-ray machine, a Siemens ultrasound and a retinal camera. About 20 patients a year are referred, usually to Cape Town, for scans.

If necessary, serious or complex cases are transferred to South Africa or the United Kingdom. From 2017, the Saint Helena Airport makes transport much faster and enables fast air evacuation of serious cases. Before this, all travel from the island were done through the RMS ship which called once per three weeks and took a week one way.

== Charges ==
Charges are payable for treatment. Costs for primary care for the local population, and emergency treatment for UK residents are modest, and rise to a maximum of £183.95 (2016 scale) for surgery. For visitors and non-residents, they are much more substantial, with a maximum of £2880.20 (2014 scale) for surgery. Comprehensive medical insurance is compulsory for visitors and non-residents.

== Expenditure ==
The British Government's Department for International Development provides support and advice to the St Helena government and produced a report on Cost-effective Delivery of Specialist Medical Services to the St. Helena Population in 2006. The report showed that expenditure on health had risen from £1,154,675 in 1993/4 to £2,050,830 in 2000/1, but was still less than 50% of the level spent on health care in the UK. Between 2000 and 2006, cancer was the most costly diagnosis in terms of referral to services off the island (45% of total cost), followed by cardiology (13%), spinal (10%), urology (8%) and orthopaedic diagnoses (8%). These 5 diagnoses accounted for 84% of the total referral cost.

The total referral cost increased by a factor of 4 between 2004 and 2005. 106 referrals were expected in 2006 where the average for earlier years was about 35 referrals. Between 2000 and 2004, the average cost of a referral was £4,000, but in 2005 it was over £12,000. The average age of patients referred also increased from 35 to 56.

== Health ==
Life expectancy is 3-3.5 years less than the United Kingdom. The Infant Mortality Rate has been reduced from 44.7 per thousand live births in 1981 to 3.9 in 2000/1.

Income inequality on the island is modest. The highest salary is 4.6 times that of the lowest paid person in full-time employment.

== Health Management ==
The health and social care portfolio is led by the Minister of Health, Martin Henry.
