= List of hospitals in Ivory Coast =

The table below lists the hospitals located in the Ivory Coast.

Hospitals in the Ivory Coast
| Name | Location | Type facility | Ownership | Coordinates | Ref |
|---|---|---|---|---|---|
| Abobo Sud Hôpital Général | Abidjan | Hôpital Général | Public | 5.4003°N 4.0127°W | |
| Adjame Hôpital Général | Abidjan | Hôpital Général | Public | 5.3663491°N 4.023183796°W | |
| Anyama Hôpital Général | Abidjan | Hôpital Général | Public | 5.484°N 4.0502°W | |
| Bingerville Hôpital Général | Abidjan | Hôpital Général | Public | 5.325°N 3.755°W | |
| Cocody Hospitalier Universitaire | Abidjan | Hospitalier Universitaire | Public | 5.3502°N 3.9792°W | |
| Houphouët Boigny de Abobo Hôpital Général | Abidjan | Hôpital Général | Public | 5.3994°N 3.9367°W | |
| Jean Delafosse de Treichville Hôpital Général | Abidjan | Hôpital Général | Public | 5.3048°N 4.0055°W | |
| Koumassi Hôpital Général | Abidjan | Hôpital Général | Public | 5.292266506°N 3.957997454°W | |
| Marcory-Centre Hôpital Général | Abidjan | Hôpital Général | Public | 5.304°N 3.9916°W | |
| Port-Bouet Hôpital Général | Abidjan | Hôpital Général | Public | 5.254818076°N 3.922969705°W | |
| Port-Bouet Vridi-Cite Hôpital Général | Abidjan | Hôpital Général | Public | 5.2573°N 4.0047°W | |
| Saint Louis Orione de Anyama Hôpital Général | Abidjan | Hôpital Général | FBO | 5.4745°N 4.052°W | |
| Treichville Hospitalier Universitaire | Abidjan | Hospitalier Universitaire | Public | 5.306°N 3.9985°W | |
| Yopougon Hospitalier Universitaire | Abidjan | Hospitalier Universitaire | Public | 5.340963303°N 4.089022718°W | |
| Yopougon-Attie Hôpital Général | Abidjan | Hôpital Général | Public | 5.3678°N 4.0916°W | |
| Buyo Hôpital Général | Bas-Sassandra District | Hôpital Général | Public | 6.271°N 6.9948°W | |
| Fresco Hôpital Général | Bas-Sassandra District | Hôpital Général | Public | 5.120845352°N 5.58136691°W | |
| Gagni Hospitalier Régional | Bas-Sassandra District | Hospitalier Régional | Public | 5.0149°N 6.7138°W | |
| Gueyo Hôpital Général | Bas-Sassandra District | Hôpital Général | Public | 5.6889°N 6.0713°W | |
| San-Pedro Hospitalier Régional | Bas-Sassandra District | Hospitalier Régional | Public | 4.7422°N 6.6465°W | |
| Sassandra Hôpital Général | Bas-Sassandra District | Hôpital Général | Public | 4.947768466°N 6.082721752°W | |
| Soubre Hôpital Général | Bas-Sassandra District | Hôpital Général | Public | 5.7821°N 6.5911°W | |
| Tabou Hôpital Général | Bas-Sassandra District | Hôpital Général | Public | 4.4168°N 7.3636°W | |
| Abengourou Hospitalier Régional | Comoe District | Hospitalier Régional | Public | 6.7154°N 3.4974°W | |
| Aboisso Hospitalier Régional | Comoe District | Hospitalier Régional | Public | 5.469077157°N 3.213124069°W | |
| Adiake Hôpital Général | Comoe District | Hôpital Général | Public | 5.279985811°N 3.299624923°W | |
| Agnibilekrou Hôpital Général | Comoe District | Hôpital Général | Public | 7.12941006°N 3.200846918°W | |
| Ayame Hôpital Général | Comoe District | Hôpital Général | Public | 5.603489731°N 3.164158632°W | |
| Bonoua Hôpital Général | Comoe District | Hôpital Général | Public | 5.270185844°N 3.593945306°W | |
| Don Orione de Bonoua Hôpital Général | Comoe District | Hôpital Général | FBO | 5.27°N 3.594°W | |
| Grand-Bassam Hôpital Général | Comoe District | Hôpital Général | Public | 5.20522°N 3.7332°W | |
| Madinani Hôpital Général | Denguele District | Hôpital Général | Public | 9.626957679°N 6.950037404°W | |
| Minignan Hôpital Général | Denguele District | Hôpital Général | Public | 10.0089269°N 7.83244316°W | |
| Odienne Hospitalier Régional | Denguele District | Hospitalier Régional | Public | 9.50511°N 7.56433°W | |
| Divo Hospitalier Régional | Goh-Djiboua District | Hospitalier Régional | Public | 5.83245°N 5.36549°W | |
| Gagnoa Hôpital Général | Goh-Djiboua District | Hôpital Général | Public | 6.0807°N 6.0628°W | |
| Gagnoa Hospitalier Régional | Goh-Djiboua District | Hospitalier Régional | Public | 6.1366°N 5.9452°W | |
| Guitry Hôpital Général | Goh-Djiboua District | Hôpital Général | Public | 5.520414711°N 5.242741892°W | |
| Lakota Hôpital Général | Goh-Djiboua District | Hôpital Général | Public | 5.84988°N 5.68333°W | |
| Oume Hôpital Général | Goh-Djiboua District | Hôpital Général | Public | 6.378236141°N 5.42455848°W | |
| Arrah Hôpital Général | Lacs District | Hôpital Général | Public | 6.670670835°N 3.974124332°W | |
| Bocanda Hôpital Général | Lacs District | Hôpital Général | Public | 7.06631°N 4.5°W | |
| Bongouanou Hôpital Général | Lacs District | Hôpital Général | Public | 6.653044377°N 4.193778247°W | |
| Daoukro Hôpital Général | Lacs District | Hôpital Général | Public | 7.054821881°N 3.962343464°W | |
| Didievi Hôpital Général | Lacs District | Hôpital Général | Public | 7.119077338°N 4.892030152°W | |
| Dimbokro Hospitalier Régional | Lacs District | Hospitalier Régional | Public | 6.64338°N 4.70559°W | |
| Djekanou Hôpital Général | Lacs District | Hôpital Général | Public | 6.473954554°N 5.115273739°W | |
| M'Bahiakro Hôpital Général | Lacs District | Hôpital Général | Public | 7.454111465°N 4.336709837°W | |
| M'Batto Hôpital Général | Lacs District | Hôpital Général | Public | 6.47197°N 4.35781°W | |
| Tiebissou Hôpital Général | Lacs District | Hôpital Général | Public | 7.162112377°N 5.224102637°W | |
| Toumodi Hôpital Général | Lacs District | Hôpital Général | Public | 6.554282455°N 5.017078632°W | |
| Adzope Hôpital Général | Lagunes District | Hôpital Général | Public | 6.10694°N 3.86194°W | |
| Agboville Hospitalier Régional | Lagunes District | Hospitalier Régional | Public | 5.930561719°N 4.214961967°W | |
| Akoupe Hôpital Général | Lagunes District | Hôpital Général | Public | 5.475175436°N 4.15478966°W | |
| Alepe Hôpital Général | Lagunes District | Hôpital Général | Public | 5.501774728°N 3.663402554°W | |
| Dabou Hôpital Général | Lagunes District | Hôpital Général | Public | 5.3226°N 4.3807°W | |
| Dabou Hôpital Général | Lagunes District | Hôpital Général | FBO | 5.3247°N 4.3732°W | |
| Grand-Lahou Hôpital Général | Lagunes District | Hôpital Général | Public | 5.1367°N 5.0186°W | |
| Jacqueville Hôpital Général | Lagunes District | Hôpital Général | Public | 5.201812765°N 4.416595998°W | |
| Sikensi Hôpital Général | Lagunes District | Hôpital Général | Public | 5.657634049°N 4.576016278°W | |
| Taabo Hôpital Général | Lagunes District | Hôpital Général | Public | 6.261812769°N 5.08509863°W | |
| Tiassale Hôpital Général | Lagunes District | Hôpital Général | Public | 5.890817787°N 4.820504155°W | |
| Bangolo Hôpital Général | Montagnes District | Hôpital Général | Public | 7.011124248°N 7.490556813°W | |
| Biankouma Hôpital Général | Montagnes District | Hôpital Général | Public | 7.742719068°N 7.616870697°W | |
| Blolequin Hôpital Général | Montagnes District | Hôpital Général | Public | 6.569205977°N 8.008596743°W | |
| Danane Hôpital Général | Montagnes District | Hôpital Général | Public | 7.26096°N 8.15417°W | |
| Duekoue Hôpital Général | Montagnes District | Hôpital Général | Public | 6.744560743°N 7.347711785°W | |
| Guiglo Hospitalier Régional | Montagnes District | Hospitalier Régional | Public | 6.54300222°N 7.489772678°W | |
| Kouibly Hôpital Général | Montagnes District | Hôpital Général | Public | 7.253315963°N 7.230514812°W | |
| Man Hospitalier Régional | Montagnes District | Hospitalier Régional | Public | 7.40275297°N 7.555766649°W | |
| Toulepleu Hôpital Général | Montagnes District | Hôpital Général | Public | 6.580644328°N 8.415291348°W | |
| Zouan-Hounien Hôpital Général | Montagnes District | Hôpital Général | Public | 6.916989738°N 8.207060167°W | |
| Bouafle Hospitalier Régional | Sassandra-Marahoue District | Hospitalier Régional | Public | 6.982725669°N 5.753143385°W | |
| Daloa Hospitalier Régional | Sassandra-Marahoue District | Hospitalier Régional | Public | 6.8547°N 6.4396°W | |
| Issia Hôpital Général | Sassandra-Marahoue District | Hôpital Général | Public | 6.483777201°N 6.585777412°W | |
| Sinfra Hôpital Général | Sassandra-Marahoue District | Hôpital Général | Public | 6.622851451°N 5.911404019°W | |
| Vavoua Hôpital Général | Sassandra-Marahoue District | Hôpital Général | Public | 7.374995616°N 6.479546126°W | |
| Zoukougbeu Hôpital Général | Sassandra-Marahoue District | Hôpital Général | Public | 6.76424486°N 6.870413659°W | |
| Zuenoula Hôpital Général | Sassandra-Marahoue District | Hôpital Général | Public | 7.424913627°N 6.040871476°W | |
| Boundiali Hôpital Général | Savanes District | Hôpital Général | Public | 9.52167°N 6.48694°W | |
| Ferkessedougou Hôpital Général | Savanes District | Hôpital Général | Public | 9.598614853°N 5.199516443°W | |
| Korhogo Hospitalier Régional | Savanes District | Hospitalier Régional | Public | 9.45803°N 5.62961°W | |
| Kouto Hôpital Général | Savanes District | Hôpital Général | Public | 9.896699757°N 6.41127903°W | |
| Tengrela Hôpital Général | Savanes District | Hôpital Général | Public | 10.48092958°N 6.396998658°W | |
| Beoumi Hôpital Général | Vallee du Bandama District | Hôpital Général | Public | 7.670755484°N 5.573912076°W | |
| Bouake Hospitalier Universitaire | Vallee du Bandama District | Hospitalier Universitaire | Public | 7.70566501°N 5.019541001°W | |
| Dabakala Hôpital Général | Vallee du Bandama District | Hôpital Général | Public | 8.361121715°N 4.420647891°W | |
| Katiola Hospitalier Régional | Vallee du Bandama District | Hospitalier Régional | Public | 8.13803°N 5.10173°W | |
| Sakassou Hôpital Général | Vallee du Bandama District | Hôpital Général | Public | 7.45693268°N 5.291495806°W | |
| Ste Camille de Bouake-Sud Hôpital Général | Vallee du Bandama District | Hôpital Général | FBO | 7.512259°N 4.945599°W | |
| Mankono Hôpital Général | Woroba District | Hôpital Général | Public | 8.070712177°N 6.191001107°W | |
| Seguela Hospitalier Régional | Woroba District | Hospitalier Régional | Public | 7.95859°N 6.67021°W | |
| Touba Hospitalier Régional | Woroba District | Hospitalier Régional | Public | 8.281°N 7.677°W | |
| Yamoussoukro Hospitalier Régional | Yamoussoukro | Hospitalier Régional | Public | 6.81442°N 5.25872°W | |
| Bondoukou Hospitalier Régional | Zanzan District | Hospitalier Régional | Public | 8.034°N 2.8005°W | |
| Bouna Hôpital Général | Zanzan District | Hôpital Général | Public | 9.271557133°N 2.999899846°W | |
| Doropo Hôpital Général | Zanzan District | Hôpital Général | FBO | 9.8096°N 3.3458°W | |
| Koun-Fao Hôpital Général | Zanzan District | Hôpital Général | Public | 7.4792°N 3.2512°W | |
| Saint Camille de Bondoukou Hôpital Général | Zanzan District | Hôpital Général | FBO | 8.044001°N 2.797°W | |
| Tanda Hôpital Général | Zanzan District | Hôpital Général | Public | 7.798393125°N 3.1679192°W | |
| Polyclinique Internationale Ste. Anne-Marie (PISAM) | Abidjan | Polyclinic | Private | 5.3368641130212175°N 4.013302661294907°W | |
| Polyclinique Internationale de L’Indénie | Abidjan | Polyclinic | Private | 5.338550271324282°N 4.019397476640542°W | |

== Gallery of hospitals ==
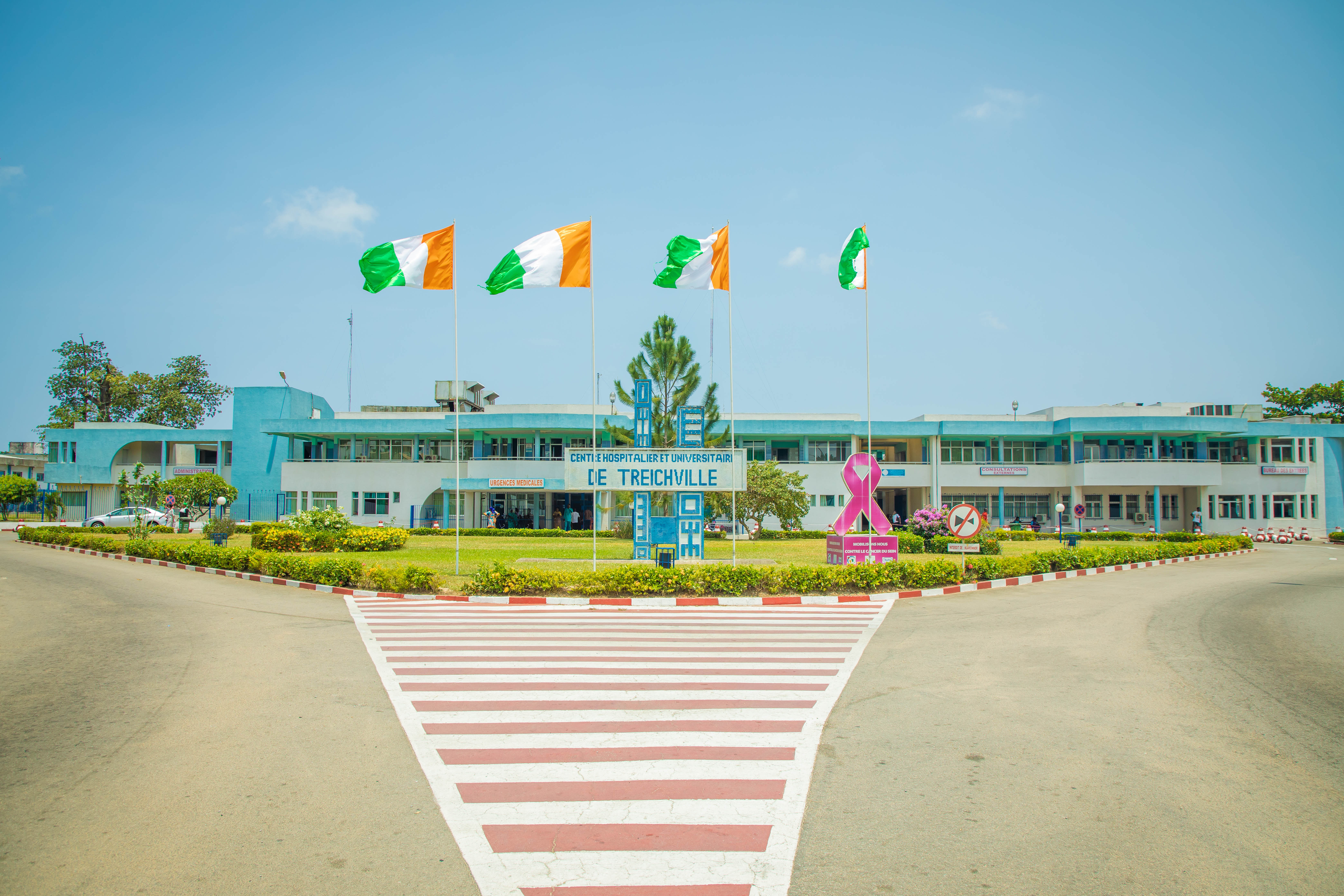
Treichville Hospitalier Universitaire

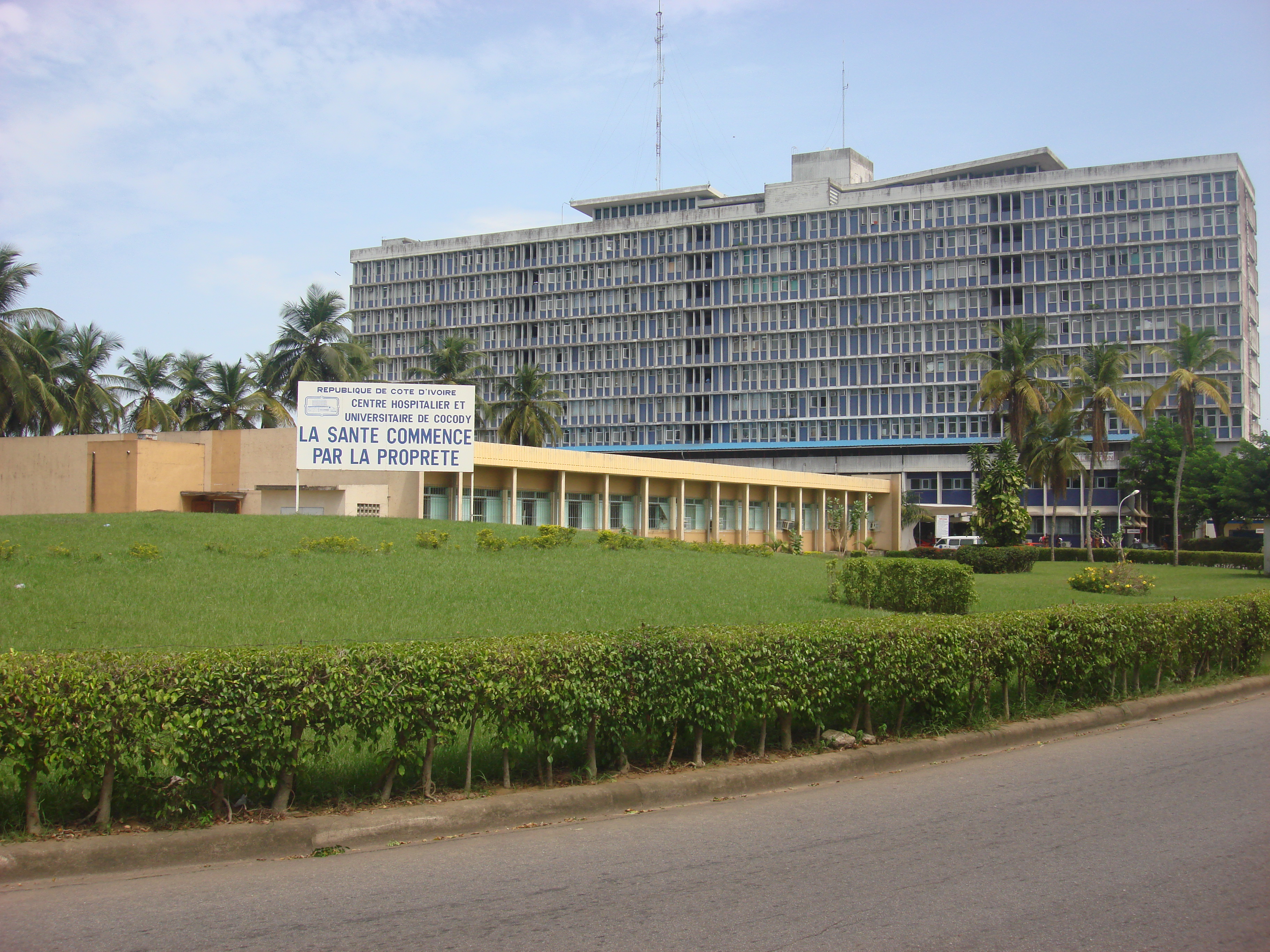
Cocody Hospitalier Universitaire
