= List of hospitals in Benin =

The following is a list of hospitals and clinics in Benin. There were 819 medical facilities in Benin, as of 2019.

== Abomey ==
The following hospitals are located in Abomey, Zou Department:

- Abomey Centre Hospitalier Départemental, Public hospital, Zou Department
- Abomey-Calavi Hôpital de Zone, Public hospital, Atlantique Department

== Cotonou and suburbs ==
The following hospitals are located in Cotonou and suburbs, Littoral Department of Benin:

- Alafia Hospital
- Ave Maria Hospital
- Azinnigbo
- Bon Acceuil
- Cabinet Medical Akperdje
- Brown Private Hospitals
- Cabinet Medical Bon Berger
- Cabinet Medical Dary Jeanne
- Cabinet Medical le Sacre Coeur
- Cabinet Medical La Vie
- Centre Medico Social Sainte Therese
- Cabinet de Soins Bignon
- Cabinet de Soins Esperanza
- Cabinet de Soins St Jeans de Dieu
- Cabinet de Sonte la Philanthrope
- Cabinet St Raphael
- Central Medical Les Palmiers
- Centre Daccouchement et de Soins
- Centre de Soins et d'Accouchement Sama
- Centre National Hospitalier Universitaire
- Centre National Hospitalier de Pneumo-Phtisiologie
- Clinique Akpedj
- Clinique Atlantique
- Clinique du Golfe
- Clinique Gynécologie Obstétrique
- Clinique Kauzipate
- Les Graces Hôpital
- Mahouna Hôpital
- Codjo Adjouavi Charlotte
- Sean jean hospital
- Julius Adeyemi Hospital
- Cotonou Hospital
- CS Peniel
- Dispensaire de Cococodj
- Jesus Est Capable
- Keneya
- Ong Aide Humanitare
- Ong Espoir Vidomegon Centre de Sante
- Cocotiers Hôpital
- Rosa Mystica
- Syocmore Hospital
- University Reference Hospital

== Parakou ==
The following hospitals are located in Parakou, Borgou Department:

- Hopital Ahmadiyya Parakou
- Parakou Hospital

== Porto Novo ==
The following hospitals are located in Porto-Novo, the capital of Benin, Ouémé Department:

- Adjohoun Hôpital de Zone
- Amour Redempteur Hôpital
- Auberge de l'Amour Redempteur
- Clinique Louis Pasteur
- Clinique St Enfant Jesus
- Clinique Saint Raphael
- El Fateh Hôpital
- Hôpital-Djéregbé
- Hopital Amadiyya Porto Novo
- Oueme-Plateau Centre Hospitalier Départemental
