= Health in Vanuatu =

Life expectancy in Vanuatu is 67 years for men, and 70 years for women.

Vanuatu has a tropical climate and over 80% of the population lives in rural, isolated villages with access to their own gardens and food supplies.

Official statistics show infant mortality declined during the last half of the twentieth century, from 123 deaths per 1,000 population in 1967 to 25 per 1,000 in 1999. There were 46.85 infant deaths per 1,000 live births in 2011.

The Human Rights Measurement Initiative finds that Vanuatu is doing 84.4% of what should be possible at its level of income, for the right to health. HRMI finds that while the right to health for the child and adult are fairly high at 99.1% and 98.4%, Vanuatu is significantly lacking in the right to reproductive health, with a score of 55.6%. Human rights experts in Vanuatu have noted that the certain people groups, such as people with disabilities, old people, people affected by climate change, and single parent families are particularly at risk of having their right to health violated.

== Healthcare ==
Health expenditure per capita is about $139 per year, under a quarter of the Western Pacific regional average, 4.2% of GDP. There is a very severe shortage of qualified health care professionals. Graduates from the Vanuatu Centre for Nursing Education are outnumbered by those retiring.

=== Transport ===
The geographically-isolated communities have minimal access to basic health and education services. Faith-Based Organizations (FBO) such as Churches, Community-Based Organizations (CBO) and Non-Government Organization's (NGO) provide a minimal level of support to many rural villages. Vanuatu government health and education services are hard pressed to deal with the rapid increase of urban and peri-urban populations in informal and squatter settlements around Port Vila and to a lesser extent in Luganville. Health services in Port Vila and Luganville provide reasonable health care, often supported and enhanced by visiting doctors. A scheme, backed by UNICEF in October 2018 for two commercial drone companies to deliver vaccines to 39 remote villages has aroused considerable interest. The drones can fly up to 100 km and carry 2.5 kg and they could be used to deliver medication or to collect samples for analysis much more cost-effectively than conventional methods. In December 2018 the first babies were vaccinated using medication transported by a drone, supplied by Swoop Aero. The vaccines, for 13 babies and 5 pregnant women, were carried in a styrofoam box with ice packs and a temperature logger in a 25-minute journey across the island of Erromango from Dillon's Bay on the west to Cook's Bay on the east.

=== Hospitals ===
There are five public hospitals, and one private hospital with 27 health centres located across the islands and more than 200 aid posts in more remote areas. The two major referral hospitals are located in Port Vila and Luganville.
