= Health in Mauritius =

Mauritius had a life expectancy of 75.17 years in 2014. 39% of Mauritian men smoked in 2014. 13% of men and 23% of women were obese in 2008.

The Human Rights Measurement Initiative finds that Mauritius is fulfilling 72.7% of what it should be fulfilling for the right to health based on its level of income. When looking at the right to health with respect to children, Mauritius achieves 94.1% of what is expected based on its current income. In regards to the right to health amongst the adult population, the country achieves only 85.0% of what is expected based on the nation's level of income. Mauritius falls into the "very bad" category when evaluating the right to reproductive health because the nation is fulfilling only 39.1% of what the nation is expected to achieve based on the resources (income) it has available.

== Healthcare ==
The Ministry of Health and Wellness is responsible for public healthcare. Dr Kailesh Jagutpal is the Minister of Health and Wellness as from 12 November 2019. The five regions each have their own Health Advisory Board. Healthcare, which is financed through general taxation, is free for Mauritian citizens.

=== Hospitals ===
There were 166 medical facilities in Mauritius in 2019. There are 5 five regional hospitals and three district hospitals

Hospitals in Mauritius
Name	City	District	Comments References
Dr. A.G. Jeetoo Regional Hospital	Port Louis	Port Louis District	Region 1
Long Mountain Community Hospital		Port Louis District	Region 2
Flacq Regional Hospital		Flacq District	Region 3
Jawaharnal Nehru Regional Hospital	Rose-Belle	Grand Port District	Region 4
Mahebourg District Hospital	Mahébourg	Grand Port District	Region 4
Souillac District Hospital	Souillac	Savanne District	Region 4
Dr. Yves Catin Community Hospital		Rivière Noire District	Region 5
Victoria Regional Hospital	Vacoas-Phoenix	Plaines Wilhems District	Region 5
Queen Elizabeth District Hospital		Rodrigues Autonomous Region	
Sir Seewoosagur Ramgoolam Regional Hospital		Pamplemousses District	Region 2, opened in 1969, largest hospital with 563 beds, intensive care unit with 8 beds and a neurosurgical and renal unit with 28 beds.
Souillac Eye Hospital	Souillac	Plaines Wilhems District	specializes in eye surgery. New laser equipment financed by the Teaching Eye Surgery, Foundation was installed in 2018.
Otorhinolaryngological hospital	Vacoas-Phoenix	Plaines Wilhems District	closed in December 2017 and is being rebuilt
Brown Sequard psychiatric clinic	Beau Bassin-Rose Hill	Plaines Wilhems District	
Subramaniam Bharati Moka Eye Hospital	Moka	Moka District	
Poudre d’Or Hospital	Poudre D'Or	Rivière du Rempart District	specialises in pulmonary diseases
Planned Cancer Hospital	Vacoas-Phoenix	Plaines Wilhems District	
