= Health in Eritrea =

The Health in Eritrea has been poor on a world scale. Nevertheless, Eritrea is one of the few countries to be on target to meet its Millennium Development Goal (MDG) targets for health. As of 2005, over two-thirds of the population lived below the national poverty line and the vast majority in rural areas, about one-third of the population lived in extreme poverty and more than half survived on less than US$1 per day. Researchers at the Overseas Development Institute have identified the health and education as a high priority, both within the government and amongst Eritreans at home and abroad. Innovative multi-sectoral approaches to health were also identified with the success.

== Resources ==
Health care and welfare resources generally are believed to be poor, although reliable information about conditions is often difficult to obtain. In 2001, the Eritrean government spent 5.7 percent of gross domestic product on national health accounts. The World Bank's World DataBank estimated that in 2004 there were only 50 physicians per 100,000 people in Eritrea, while the World Health Organization (WHO) estimated only 3. The two-year war with Ethiopia, coming on the heels of a 30-year struggle for independence, negatively affected the health sector and the general welfare. The rate of prevalence of human immunodeficiency virus/acquired immune deficiency syndrome (HIV/AIDS), although low by sub-Saharan African standards, was high enough at 2.7 percent in 2003 to be considered a generalized epidemic.

Between 1995 and 2005, impressive results were achieved. Life expectancy at birth has increased from 39.1 in 1960 to 59.5 years in 2008, maternal and child mortality rates have dropped dramatically and the health infrastructure has been expanded (please see table). In 2008 average life expectancy was slightly less than 53 years, according to the WHO. Immunisation and child nutrition has been tackled by working closely with schools in a multi-sectoral approach; the number of children vaccinated against measles almost doubled in seven years, from 40.7% to 78.5% and the underweight prevalence among children decreased by 12% in 1995–2002 (severe underweight prevalence by 28%). This has helped to some small extent even out rural-urban and rich-poor inequity in health.

== Diseases ==
Malaria control is an important component of the Eritrean preventive health policy. The National Malaria Protection Unit of the Ministry of Health has registered tremendous improvements in reducing malarial mortality by as much as 85% and the number of cases by 92% between 1998 and 2006. These impressive gains are the result of the Ministry of Health "...running [a] strong and effective national programme..."

	Then	Now	Source
Life expectancy	39.1 (1960)	77.19 (2013)	CIA Fact book
Under five mortality rate per 1,000 live births	205 (1975)	39.38 (2013)	CIA Fact book
Immunisation coverage (measles)	34% (1993)	95% (2008)	MDG Indicators
Children underweight	43.7% (1995)	38.4% (2002)	DHS 1995/DHS 2002
Maternal mortality ratio per 100,000 live births	998 (1995)	240 (2013)	CIA Fact Book
Antenatal care coverage	48.9% (1995)	70.3%(2002)	DHS 1995/DHS 2002
Births attended by skilled health personnel	20.6% (1995)	28.3% (2002)	DHS 1995/DHS 2002
Health infrastructure	16 hospitals; 4 health centres; 106 health stations (1991)	25 hospitals; 52 health centres; 180 health stations; 113 clinics (2008)	MoH (2008) and WHO (2009)
Physicians (per 1,000 people)	0.2 (1993)	0.5 (2004)	World DataBank

=== Hospitals ===
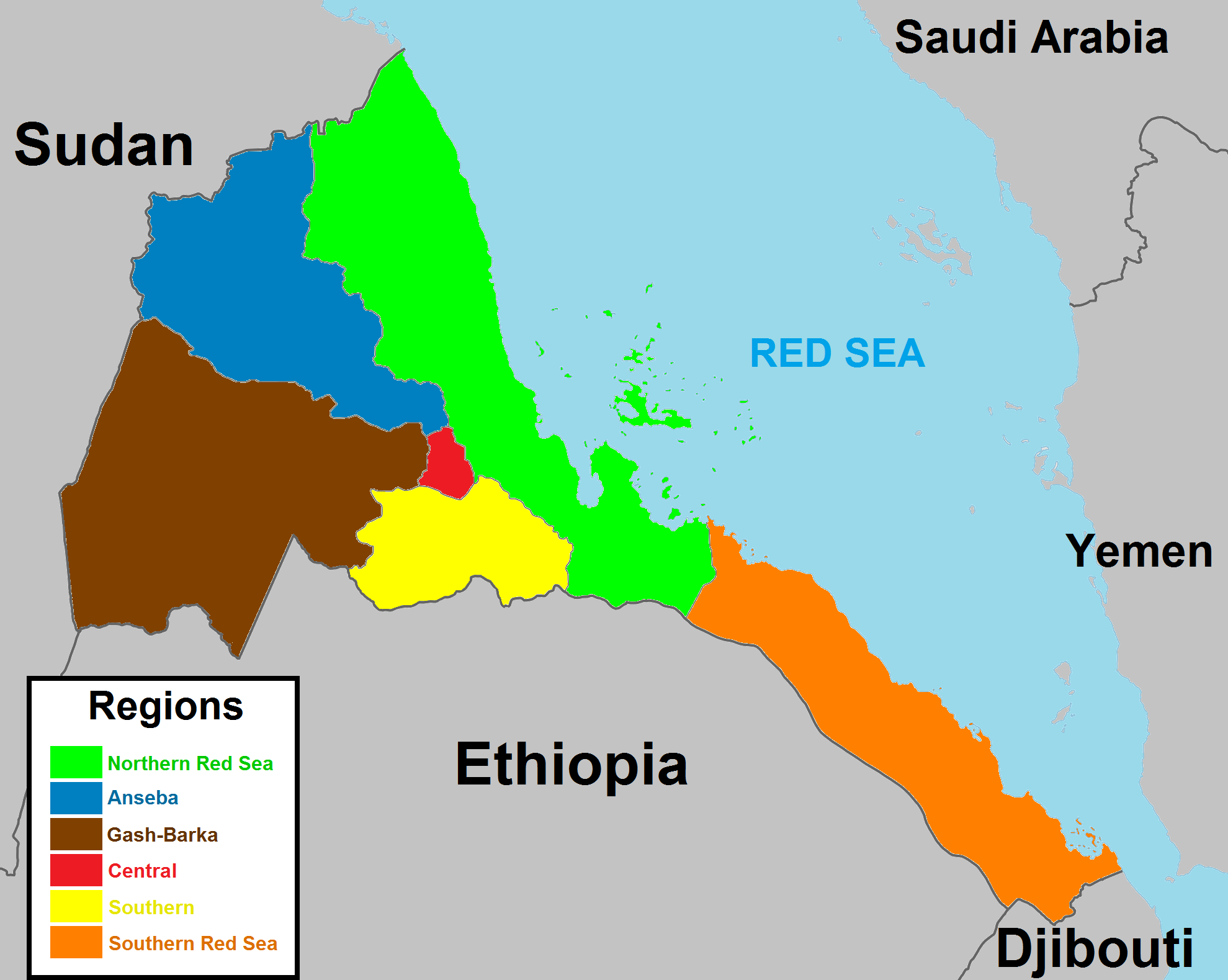
Regions of Eritria

There were 272 medical facilities in Eritrea in 2019, including 22 hospitals listed below by type and location. The Hanssenian National Referral Hospital is managed by a NGO and the rest are managed by the Ministry of Health of Eritrea. The other 247 medical facilities are clinics and health centers managed by the Ministry of Health. There is also a psychiatric hospital, St Mary's Psychiatric Hospital Sembel, in the Eritrean capital, Asmara, Central Region.

Hospitals in Eritrea
Name	Region	Type facility	Ref
Keren Hospital	Anseba Region	Hospital	
Adi Kuala Mini Hospital	Southern Region (Debub)	Mini Hospital	
Adi Qeyh Hospital	Southern Region	Hospital	
Dekemhare Hospital	Southern Region	Hospital	
Mendefera Hospital	Southern Region	Hospital	
Senafe Mini Hospital	Southern Region	Mini Hospital	
Blienkoma Hospital	Southern Red Sea Region	Hospital	
Edi Mini Hospital	Southern Red Sea Region (Debubawi)	Mini Hospital	
Thio Mini Hospital	Southern Red Sea Region	Mini Hospital	
Aqhurdet Hospital	Gash-Barka Region	Hospital	
Barentu Referral Hospital	Gash-Barka Region	Hospital	
Teseney Hospital	Gash Barka Region	Hospital	
Denden Hospital	Central Region	Hospital	
Edaga Hamus Mini Hospital	Central Region	Mini Hospital	
Halibet Hospital Kahawta	Central Region	Hospital	
Hanssenian National Referral Hospital	Central Region	National referral hospital	
Haz Haz Hospital	Central Region	Hospital	
Sembel Hospital	Central Region	Hospital	
Orotta National Referral Hospital	Central Region	National referral hospital	
Mekane Hiwet Hospital	Central Region	Pediatrics hospital	
Berhane Eye Hospital Mai Temenai	Central Region	Eye hospital	
Afabet Hospital	Northern Red Sea (NRS)	Hospital	
Ghindae Hospital	Northern Red Sea	Hospital	
Massawa Hospital	Northern Red Sea	Hospital	
Nakfa Hospital	Northern Red Sea	Hospital	

In 2003 Eritrea opened its first medical college in an effort to narrow the healthcare worker gap. By 2012 the medical college's graduates will triple the number of pediatricians and double the number of surgeons in Eritrea.
