= Health in São Tomé and Príncipe =

The Human Rights Measurement Initiative finds that São Tomé and Príncipe is fulfilling 80.4% of what it should be fulfilling for the right to health based on its level of income. When looking at the right to health with respect to children, São Tomé and Príncipe achieves 96.0% of what is expected based on its current income. In regards to the right to health amongst the adult population, the country achieves 91.5% of what is expected based on the nation's level of income. São Tomé and Príncipe falls into the "very bad" category when evaluating the right to reproductive health because the nation is fulfilling only 53.8% of what the nation is expected to achieve based on the resources (income) it has available.

There was a resurgence of malaria in São Tomé and Príncipe in 2010, but the exact cause is unknown. Female life expectancy at birth was 65.1 years in between 2005 and 2010, and male life expectancy at 62.8 for the same time period. Healthy life expectancy at birth was at 64.7 years in 2011.

According to WHO, São Tomé and Príncipe is also home to the largest documented amount of iron-deficiency anemia amongst any country's population.

== Healthcare ==
A Cuban medical team of ten doctors, nurses and other health workers is working on the main island, with occasional visits to Príncipe.

Government health expenditure per capita was at US$90.73 (current US$) in 2009.

=== Hospitals ===
In 2019, there were 50 medical facilities in São Tomé and Principe, including six Centro de Saúde, 29 Posto de Saúde, 13 Postos de Saúde Comunitária, and two hospitals.

- Dr. Ayres de Menezes Hospital - São Tomé
- Manuel Quaresma Dias da Graça Hospital - Santo António
