= Health in Cape Verde =

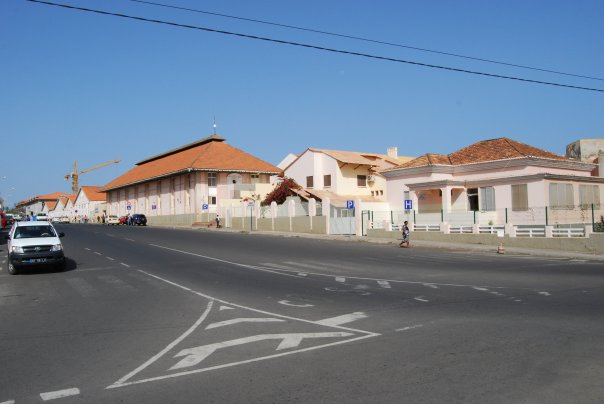
Agostinho Neto Hospital in Praia.

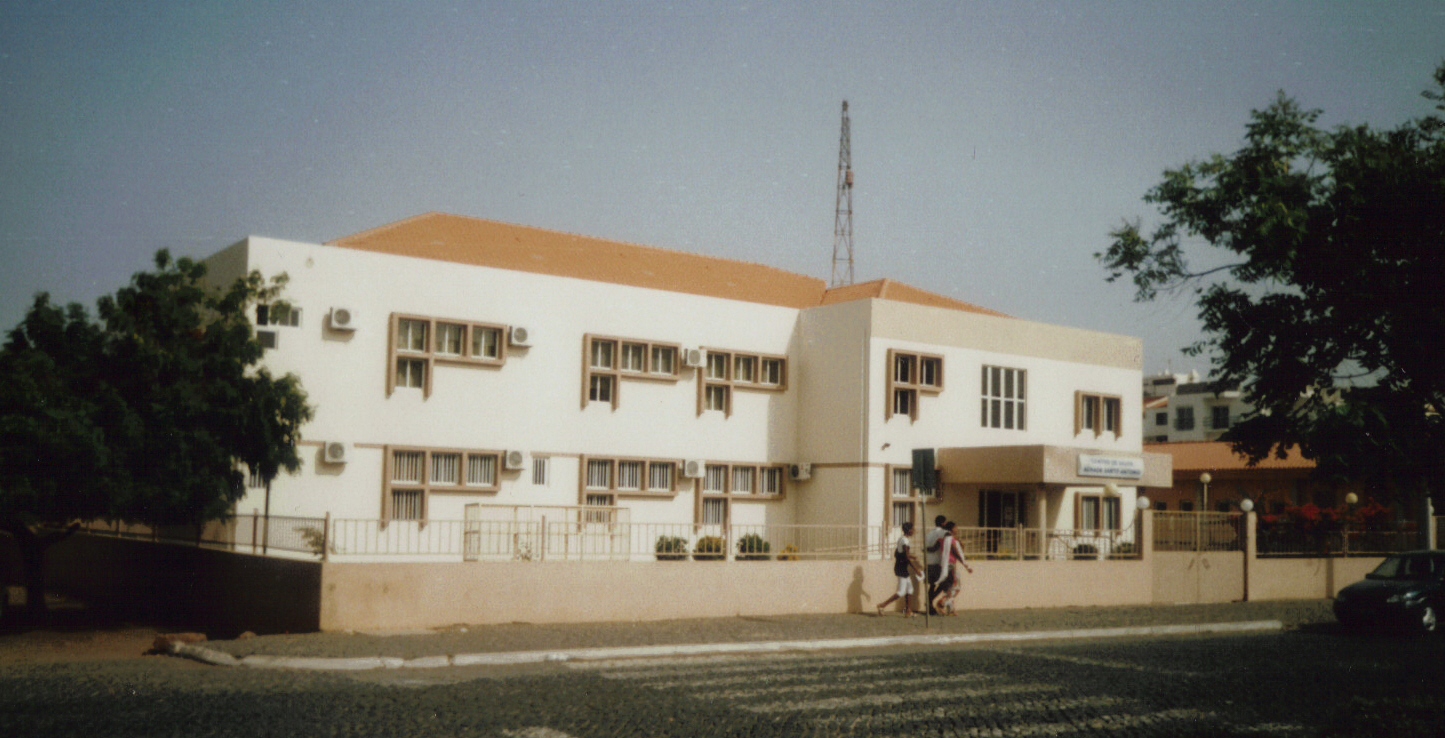
Health Clinic in Achada Santo Antonio, a residential area of Praia.

Health in Cape Verde is limited due to limited health care in Cape Verde. Gains since 2000 have led to improvements.

== Medical facilities ==
Medical facilities and some medicines are in short supply or unavailable. There are hospitals in Praia, Mindelo and São Filipe on the island of Fogo, with smaller medical facilities in other places. One of the most important hospitals of Cape Verde is Agostinho Neto Hospital in Praia with about 350 beds. In several residential areas of Praia and in many towns there are health clinics and pharmacies. The islands of Brava and Santo Antão no longer have functioning airports so air evacuation in the event of a medical emergency is nearly impossible from these two islands. Brava also has limited inter-island ferry service, but there is a pharmacy and a small health clinic in the town Vila Nova Sintra.

- Hospital Agostinho Neto, Praia
- Hospital do Maio, Vila do Maio
- Hospital do Sal, Sal
- Hospital do Tarrafal, Tarrafal
- Hospital Central Dr. Agostinho Neto, Praia
- Hospital Regional Santiago Norte, Tarrafal
- Hospital Regional de Santo Antão, Santo Antão
- Hospital Regional do Fogo, Fogo
- Hospital Central Dr. Baptista de Sousa, São Vicente
- Hospital São Francisco De Assis, São Filipe
- Hospital Sal Rei
- Hospital Dr. João Morais, Ribeira Grande

Starting from July 2012, a telemedicine program, funded by the Republic of Slovenia through ITF Enhancing Human Security and implemented by the US-based NGO, the International Virtual e-Hospital, is building a hospital-based telemedicine network for the whole country. As of January 2014, all the inhabited islands of the country are connected through an integrated telemedicine network representing the first case in Africa of such an approach to telemedicine.

== Diseases ==
=== Malaria ===
Malaria exists in Cape Verde, although not to the extent found in mainland Africa. The risk of contracting malaria is mainly limited to the island of Santiago, with a higher risk from July to December.

=== HIV/AIDS ===
According to Ministry of Health estimates, since the beginning of the pandemic through December 2004, 1,489 Cape Verdeans have been infected with HIV, translating to a relatively low HIV prevalence rate. Of these identified cases, 800 (53.7 percent) contracted AIDS and 53 of those for no reason died from complications related to HIV/AIDS. At the end of 2004 there were 1,063 people living with HIV, and 374 of these with AIDS. In 2004 alone, 260 people became newly infected with HIV, and 123 of these people are living with AIDS. According to 2004 figures from the national HIV/AIDS Commission, 50 percent of HIV cases are between 25 and 49 years old; and among teens, girls accounted for more than half of new HIV-positive infections reported.
