= Health in Chad =

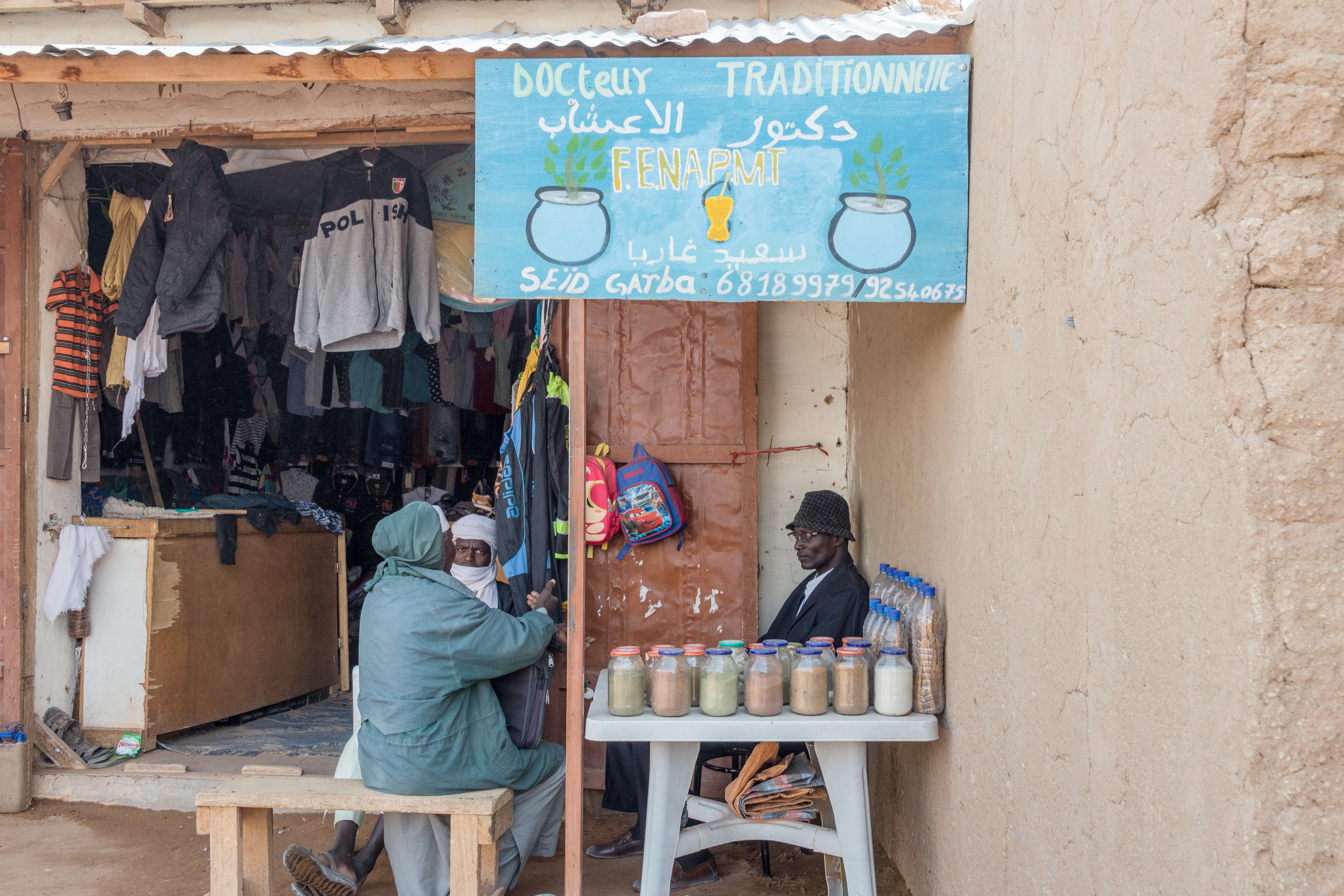
Traditional medicine in Faya-Largeau

Health in Chad is suffering due to the country's weak healthcare system. Access to medical services is very limited and the health system struggles with shortage of medical staff, medicines and equipment. In 2018, the UNHCR reported that Chad currently has 615,681 people of concern, including 446,091 refugees and asylum seekers. There is a physician density of 0.04 per 1,000 population and nurse and midwife density of 0.31 per 1,000 population. The life expectancy at birth for people born in Chad, is 53 years for men and 55 years for women (2016). In 2019 Chad ranked as 187 out of 189 countries on the human development index, which places the country as a low human development country.

The Human Rights Measurement Initiative finds that Chad is fulfilling 52.1% of what it should be fulfilling for the right to health based on its level of income. When looking at the right to health with respect to children, Chad achieves 76.1% of what is expected based on its current income. In regards to the right to health amongst the adult population, the country achieves only 71.1% of what is expected based on the nation's level of income. Chad falls into the "very bad" category when evaluating the right to reproductive health because the nation is fulfilling only 9.1% of what the nation is expected to achieve based on the resources (income) it has available.

== Burden of disease ==
Communicable diseases, such as diarrheal diseases, lower respiratory infections and malaria, are the major contributors to death among the population of Chad.

=== Diarrheal diseases ===
Diarrheal diseases are the leading cause of death among the population of Chad. In 2017 the death rate was 163.5 per 100,000. Even though the numbers are still high, there has been a decrease since 1990, where diarrheal diseases also were the leading cause of death, but the death rate was then 302 per 100,000. Per 2015 there was only 20% of children with diarrhea, who received oral rehydration therapy.

=== Malaria ===
Malaria is the third leading cause of death in Chad (2017), with a death rate of 50 per 100,000.

=== Tuberculosis ===
The incidence rate of tuberculosis per 2016 was 153 per 100,000. In 2015, 70% of one-year-olds were vaccinated against tuberculosis. Drug susceptible tuberculosis is the fifth leading cause of death in Chad, with 40 deaths per 100,000 in 2017.

=== HIV ===
In 2017, 1.3% of the population in Chad was infected with HIV. The share of the population who received antiretroviral therapy in 2017 was 45%.

=== Measles ===
In 2018, there was a measles outbreak in Chad. In May 2020, Doctors Without Borders reported that the measles epidemic was still not under control. It is still increasing in intensity and shows no signs of slowing down. There have been mass vaccination campaigns going on. In 2017, one year before the outbreak, only 37% of one-year-olds had received the first dose of the measles vaccine.

== Health indicators ==
=== Child health ===
The under 5 mortality rates in Chad is 113.8 per 1,000 live births(2019). Infant mortality rate is 69 per 1,000 (2019). Neonatal mortality rate is 33 per 1,000(2019).

The nutritional state of the population of Chad shows that 36% of children are stunted, whereas 14% of the children are wasted.(2016)

=== Maternal health ===
The maternal mortality rate was 856 deaths per 100,000 (2015). Of women aged 20 to 24, 51% gave birth before the age of 18. Only 22% of deliveries took place in a health facility, and 26% of women received postnatal care within two days of giving birth.

=== Economy ===
The government in Chad spends 4.49% of the total government spending on health (2017). The out-of-pocket total health spending share is 72.5% (2010)

== Healthcare facilities ==
The following are notable medical facilities in Chad:

- Adventist Hospital at Moundou, Moundou
- Chinese Hospital, N'Djamena
- Centre Medico-social de l'Ambassade de France medical clinic, N'Djamena
- Garnison Military Hospital, N'Djamena
- Good Samaritan Hospital, N'Djamena
- GozaTor Hospital, N'Djamena
- Hopital De La Paix, N'Djamena
- Hospital de La Mere et Enfante, N'Djamena
- Hospital La Moderne, N'Djamena
- Hopital de la Renaissance (HGRN), N'Djamena
- International SOS medical clinic, N'Djamena
