= Health in Seychelles =

Seychelles has reached the epidemiological shift from communicable to noncommunicable diseases. Most communicable and infectious diseases have been controlled or eradicated. In 2014 the World Health Organization reported that the country was on target to achieve the Millennium Development Goals and had addressed some of the social determinants of health.

== Life expectancy ==
The following demographic statistics are from the CIA World Factbook:

The infant mortality rate was 15.53 deaths per 1,000 live births in 2005

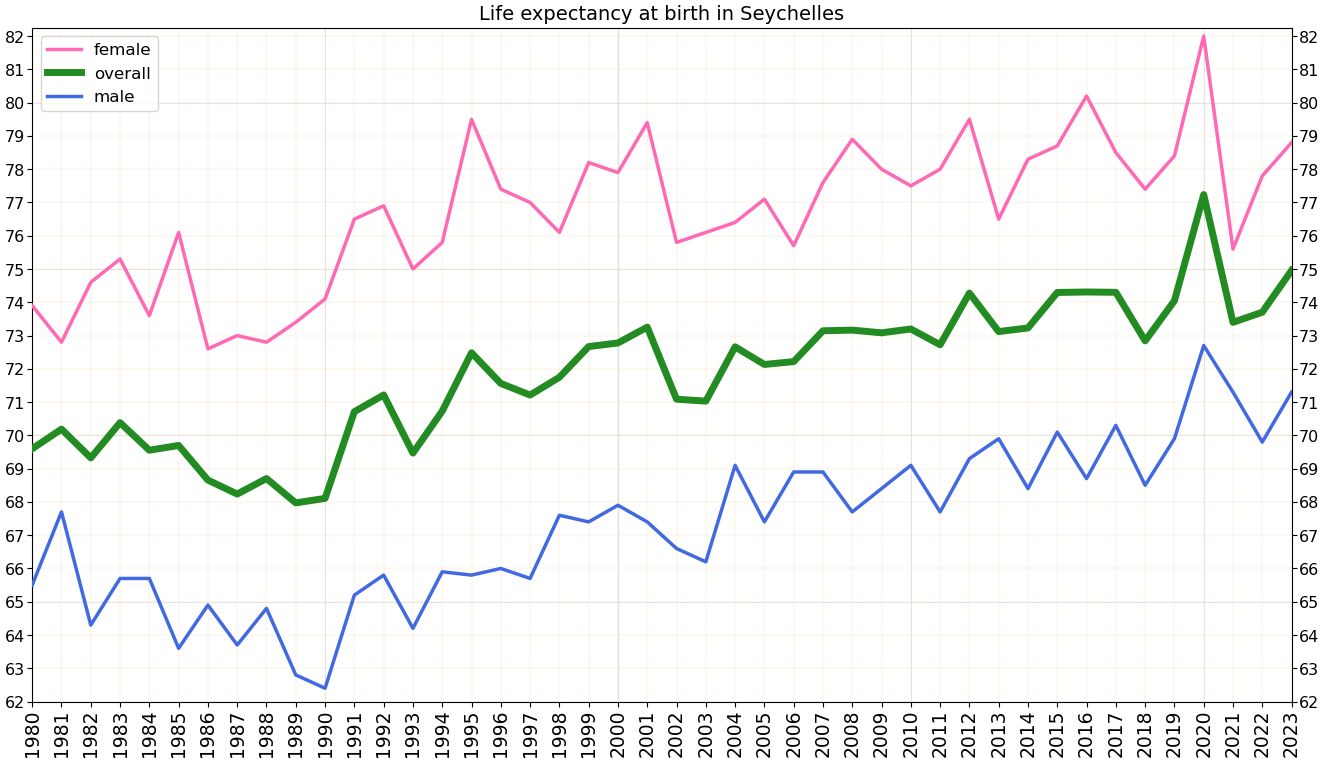
Life expectancy at birth in Seychelles

Period	Life expectancy in Years
1950–1955	57.96
1955–1960	▲59.41
1960–1965	▲62.84
1965–1970	▲64.39
1970–1975	▲66.99
1975–1980	▲69.02
1980–1985	▲70.33
1985–1990	▲71.14
1990–1995	▼70.54
1995–2000	▲71.36
2000–2005	▲72.11
2005–2010	▲72.32
2010–2015	▲72.95

== Healthcare ==
There is free access to primary healthcare for all citizens but to access tertiary health services people travel to Kenya or South Africa and pay. There are specialized services on Mahé. There are some small private medical clinics on Mahé.

In 2014 there was about one doctor per 780 people and one nurse for 400 people.

=== Hospitals ===
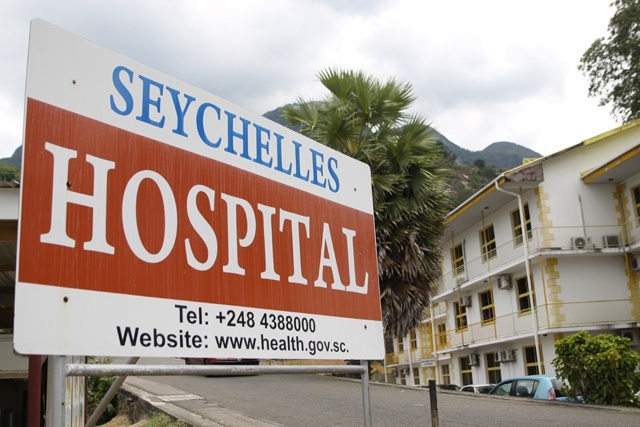
Sign outside a hospital in Seychelles

There was in 2019 one hospital and 17 Health Centers in the Seychelles.

Medical facilities in the Seychelles
Name	Location	Type facility	Ref
Anse Aux Pins Health Centre	Anse aux Pins	Health Centre	
Anse Boileau Health Centre	Anse Boileau	Health Centre	
Anse Royale Health Centre	Anse Royale	Health Centre	
Baie Lazare Health Centre	Baie Lazare	Health Centre	
Beau Vallon Health Centre	Belombre	Health Centre	
English River Health Centre	English River	Health Centre	
Glacis Health Centre	Glacis	Health Centre	
La Passe La Digue Health Centre	La Digue	Health Centre	
Les Mamelles Health Centre	Les Mamelles	Health Centre	
Mahe (Victoria) National Referral Hospital	Mont Fleuri	National Referral Hospital	
Mont Fleuri Health Centre	Mont Fleuri	Health Centre	
Beoliere Health Centre	Port Glaud	Health Centre	
La Misere Health Centre	Port Glaud	Health Centre	
Port Glaud Health Centre	Port Glaud	Health Centre	
Baie Ste Anne Praslin Health Centre	Praslin	Health Centre	
Grand Anse Praslin Health Centre	Praslin	Health Centre	
Silhouette Health Centre	Silhouette Island	Health Centre	
Takamaka Health Centre	Takamaka	Health Centre	
