= Health in Burkina Faso =

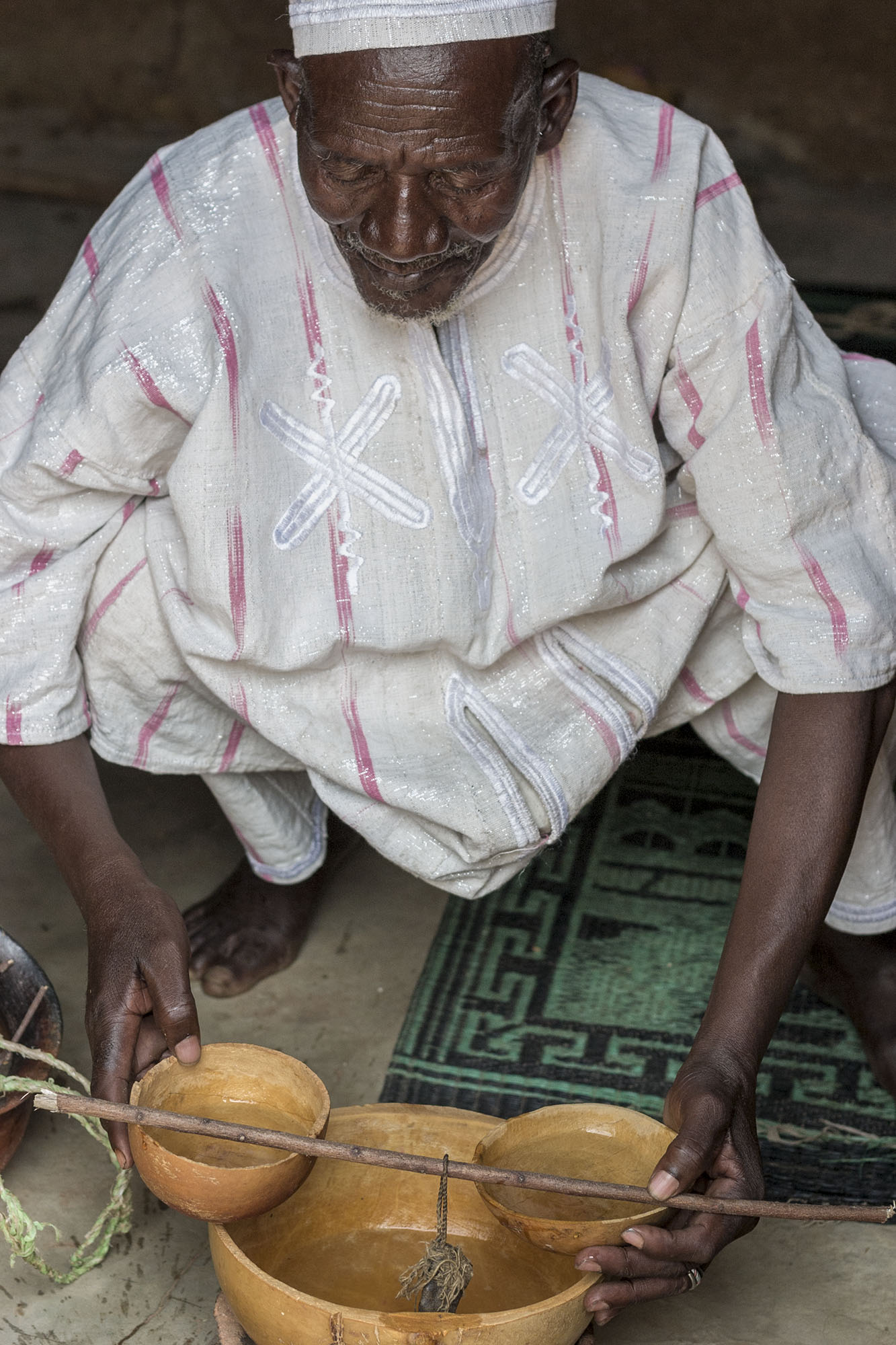
Traditional healer in Banfora (2010)

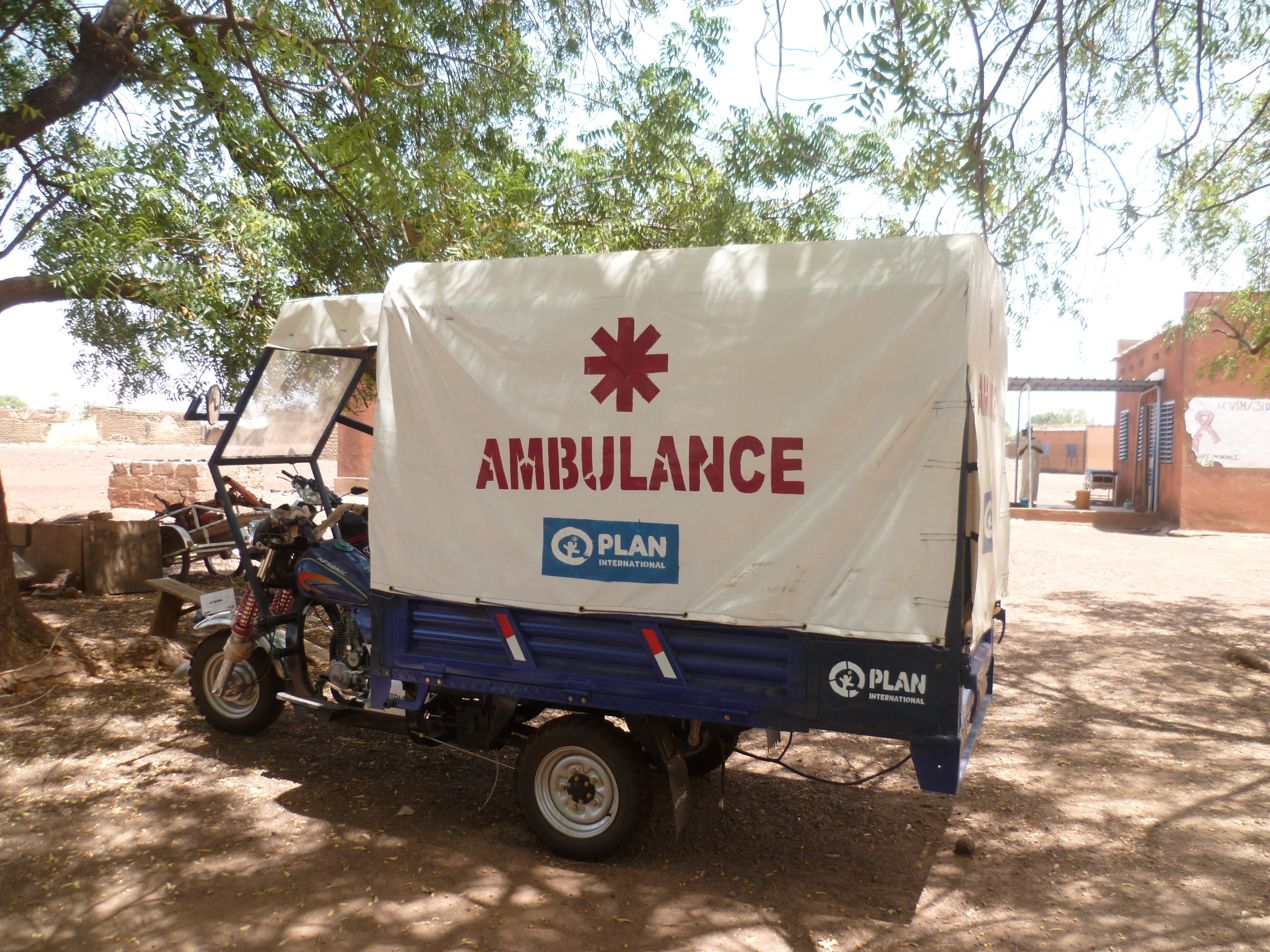
Ambulance in Yilou (2018)

A landlocked sub-Saharan country, Burkina Faso is among the poorest countries in the world—44 percent of its population lives below the international poverty line of US$1.90 per day (UNICEF 2017)—and it ranks 185th out of 188 countries on UNDP's 2016 Human Development Index (UNDP 2016). Rapid population growth, gender inequality, and low levels of educational attainment contribute to food insecurity and poverty in Burkina Faso. The total population is just over 20 million with the estimated population growth rate is 3.1 percent per year and seven out of 10 Burkinabe are younger than 30. Total health care expenditures were an estimated 5% of GDP. Total expenditure on health per capita is 82 (int dollar) in 2014.

Despite increased government funding and an effective expansion of proven health interventions, Burkina Faso still faces major challenges in the health sector. Communicable diseases continue to be the primary cause of morbidity and mortality in the country, with malaria being the largest contributor to mortality for children under 5 years of age. In addition, Burkina Faso did not fully meet Millennium Development Goals in child mortality, maternal mortality and sanitation. USAID is contributing to new advances in health by increasing malaria prevention and control and expanding access to improved water resources, sanitation and family planning.

A new measure of expected human capital calculated for 195 countries from 1990 to 2016 and defined for each birth cohort as the expected years lived from age 20 to 64 years and adjusted for educational attainment, learning or education quality, and functional health status was published by The Lancet in September 2018. Burkina Faso had the fourth lowest level of expected human capital countries with 3 health, education, and learning-adjusted expected years lived between age 20 and 64 years. This was an improvement over 1990 when its score was 1.

The Human Rights Measurement Initiative finds that Burkina Faso is fulfilling 72.6% of what it should be fulfilling for the right to health based on its level of income. When looking at the right to health with respect to children, Burkina Faso achieves 81.6% of what is expected based on its current income. In regards to the right to health amongst the adult population, the country achieves 85.0% of what is expected based on the nation's level of income. Burkina Faso falls into the "very bad" category when evaluating the right to reproductive health because the nation is fulfilling only 51.1% of what the nation is expected to achieve based on the resources (income) it has available.

== Overall health indicators ==
Burkina Faso nutrition data, based on SMART (Standardized Monitoring and Assessment of Relief and Transitions) surveys conducted by the Ministry of Health 2015–2017, was as follows, per the USAID.

Indicators	2015 (%)	2017 (%)
Prevalence of stunting (under 5 years)	30	21
Prevalence of underweight (under 5 years)	23	16
Prevalence of wasting ( under 5 years)	10	9
Prevalence of low birth weight	14	NA
Prevalence of anemia ( 6–59 months)n	83	NA
Prevalence of anemia ( reproductive aged )	62	NA
Prevalence of thinness ( reproductive aged women)	16	NA
Prevalence of thinness ( adolescent girls)	23	NA
Exclusive breastfed children	47	48
Prevalence of early initiation of breastfeeding	47	56
Prevalence of children who received a prelacteal feed	36	NA
Prevalence of breastfed children 6–23 months receiving minimum acceptable diet	14	14
Prevalence of overweight/ obesity among children under 5 years	1	2
Prevalence of overweight/ obesity among women of reproductive age	11	NA
Coverage of iron for pregnant women ( for at least 90 days)	50	NA
Coverage of vitamin A supplements for children	87	76
Percentage of children (6-59months ) living in households with iodized salt	23	NA

== Life expectancy ==
Life expectancy development in Burkina Faso

In 2023, the average life expectancy in Burkina Faso was estimated at 58,9 for males and 63,2 for females which gives it a world life expectancy ranking of 179.

== HIV AIDS ==
In 2016, Burkina Faso had 3400 (2200 - 5000) new HIV infections and 3100 (2000 - 4500) AIDS-related deaths. There were 95 000 (77 000 - 120 000) people living with HIV in 2016, among whom 60% (49% - 74%) were accessing anti retroviral therapy. Among pregnant women living with HIV, 83% (65% - >95%) were accessing treatment or prophylaxis to prevent transmission of HIV to their children. An estimated <1000 (<500 - <1000) children were newly infected with HIV due to mother-to-child transmission. The key populations most affected by HIV in Burkina Faso are sex workers, with an HIV prevalence of 16.2%, gay men and other men who have sex with men, with an HIV prevalence of 3.6% and prisoners, with an HIV prevalence of 3%. In Burkina Faso, three out of four girls and women have undergone FGM (Female Genital Mutilation) . But work to reverse this trend is proving successful: community meetings, peer education and a law banning the practice have helped to reduce the numbers of girls getting cut by 31%. Overall, These figures highlight the ongoing public health challenges in the country.

Population Statistics
Total population(2016)	20 million
Gross national income per capita (PPP international $, 2013)	1992 int dollar
Life expectancy at birth m/f (years, 2016)	60/61
Under five mortality rate (per 1 000 live births, 2016)	102
Infant/under one mortality rate (per 1 000 live births, 2016	66
Neonatal mortality rate (per 1 000 live births, 2016)	28
Probability of dying between 15 and 60 years m/f (per 1 000 population, 2016)	273/239
Total expenditure on health per capita (Intl $, 2014)	82
Total expenditure on health as % of GDP (2014)	5

== Evolution ==
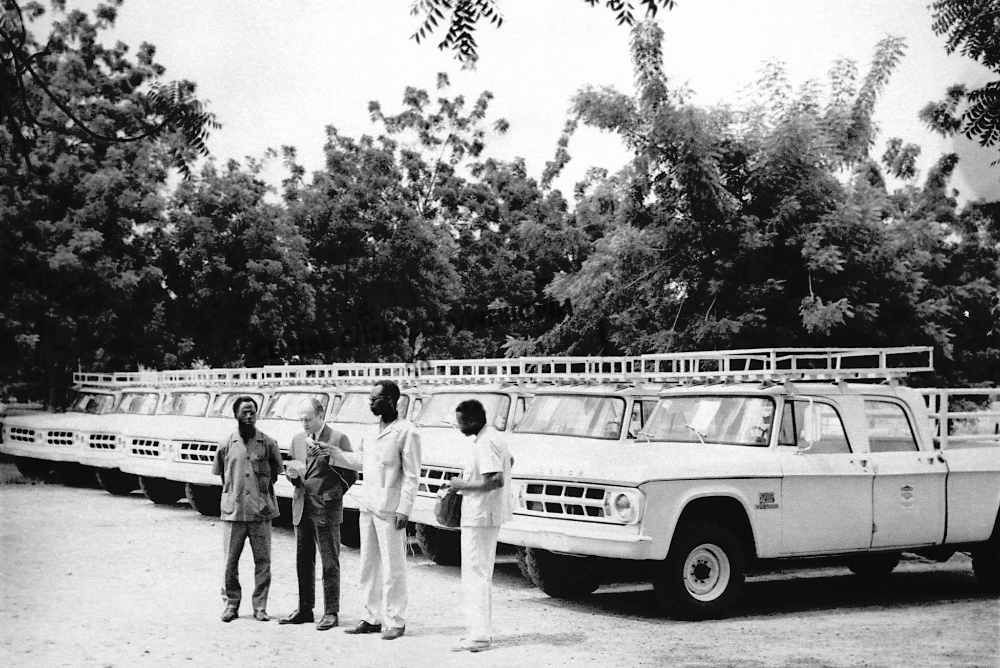
Trucks being donated to Upper Volta in 1969 as part of the global smallpox eradication campaign.

- 1960-1979 In place was an "all state" model, strongly centralized with a weak health system infrastructure, and a strong presence of mobile health teams coming from a centralized level. There was no involvement of the local populations. Under the "all state" model, the state managed everything. Communities were not consulted, nor were they implicated in the management of the health services provided. Consequences of this model were geographic and financial inaccessibility as well as a weak frequentation of health services, causing high levels of illness and death.
- 1980-1990 The concept of primary healthcare was introduced along with the creation of primary healthcare posts. However, the healthcare system was still largely based on the "all state" model which was showing its limitations.
- 1987 At the conference of African Ministers of Health in Bamako, Mali, it was found that there were many weaknesses in centralization. All decisions were made at high levels. Local communities had no forum to voice concerns of weak coverage and the lack of services available. Also within the health infrastructure, it was found that the cost of services were high, as were levels of death. L’Initiative de Bamako (IB) – The Bamako Initiative was therefore developed based on decentralizing resources in order to reinforce the ideology of Primary Health Care - Soins de Santé Primaires (SSP). This system gave the responsibility for the management of their own healthcare entirely to the community level. Les Soins de Santé Primaires (SSP) – Primary Health Care was essentially based on practical techniques and methodology. Scientifically valuable and socially acceptable, the system was rendered universally accessible to individuals and families in the community. The country could then assume autonomy and self-determination in each step of their health development.
- 1991–present The healthcare system was reorganized into Health Districts that function under the Bamako Initiative. This was effectively put into place in Burkina Faso in October 1993.

== Three level pyramidal health system ==
As of 2019, there were 1,721 medical facilities in Burkina Faso.

- Administratively, Burkina Faso has a three-level pyramidal health system that comprises from the top to the bottom:
  - The national and central health directorates, all located in Ouagadougou, the capital city. These are the national directorates of the Ministry of Health and also the cabinet of the Minister of Health in Burkina Faso. The role of this top level is to draw the national health policy in Burkina Faso and to take appropriate measures for funding and implementation of the health policy.
  - The regional structures at the intermediate level consist of 13 regional health directorates that are in charge of health policy implementation in each of the 13 administrative regions of the country.
  - The peripheral or district level at the bottom is made of 63 health districts and 1495 primary health facilities (in 2012) which are named Centre de Santé et de Promotion Social (CSPS). This level is in charge of health policy implementation and also provides data and reports needed for changes or new recommendations about the national health policy.

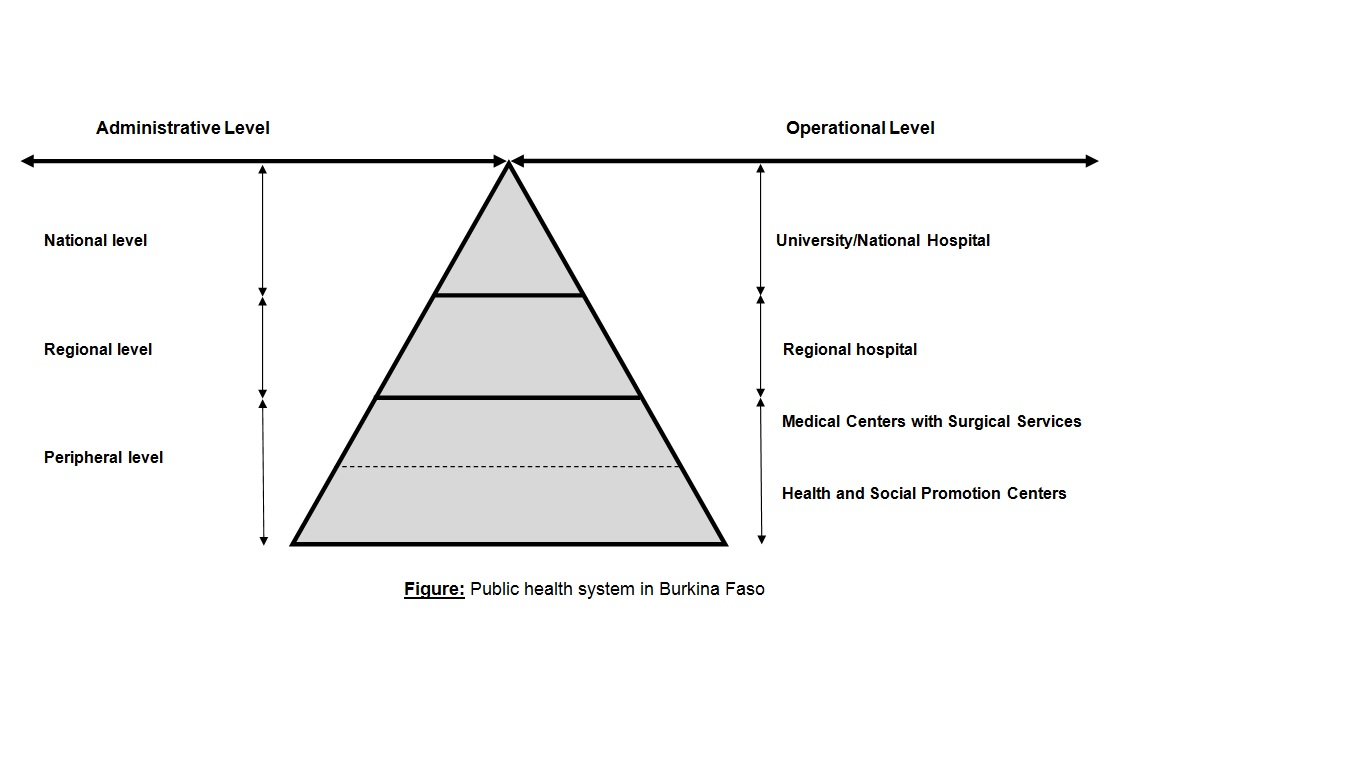
Health System in Burkina Faso

- On the organizational aspect, the health care system comprises from the top to bottom:
  - Three university hospitals, two in Ouagadougou (Pediatrie Charles de Gaull Centre Hospitalier Universitaire National and Yalgado Ouedraogo Centre Hospitalier Universitaire National) and one in Bobo-Dioulasso (Souro Sanou Centre Hospitalier Universitaire National), and one national hospital (Blaise Compaore Centre Hospitalier National). These facilities are expected to provide the highest available quality of care in Burkina Faso. Medical care is provided by medical experts (specialists) and clinical research should be conducted in these settings.
  - Nine regional hospitals scattered through the 13 regions of Burkina Faso (Dédougou Centre Hospitalier Régional, Banfora Centre Hospitalier Régional, Tenkodogo Centre Hospitalier Régional, Kaya Centre Hospitalier Régional, Koudougou Centre Hospitalier Régional, Fada Centre Hospitalier Régional, Ouahigouya Centre Hospitalier Régional, Dori Centre Hospitalier Régional, and Gaoua Centre Hospitalier Régional). These facilities are referral hospitals for a given region and the staffs include specialists in gynaecology-obstetrics and in general surgery.
  - Sixty-three district hospitals of which 43 can provide comprehensive emergency obstetric care (i.e. caesarean section and transfusion) and 1429 primary health facilities (in 2012) that provide basic health care.

== Organization of the peripheral level ==
- District: The District Health Team provides technical assistance to and is the administrative authority over the CMA, CSPS, and CoGes. The District Team is responsible for technical guidance and the proper functioning of the Health District. The Team is composed of at least four staff members that oversee the following areas: planning, supervision, training, management, health research
- Medical centers with surgical services: The medical centers with surgical services serve as a technical assistant to the primary health facilities. Each has a large specialized staff. Technical Services Provided are Medical, Pediatric, Surgery, Laboratory, Orthodontist, Pharmacy
- Primary health facilities or Centre de Santé et Promotion Sociale (CSPS): The CSPS provides a Minimum Package of Services, comprising activities pertaining to both preventive and curative care, and also maternal and infant health.
  - Preventative Care: Health Education, prevention and Control of Locally Endemic Diseases, promotion of Food Supply and Proper Nutrition, adequate Supply of Safe Water and Basic Sanitation
  - Curative Care: General Consultations, treatment of Common Illnesses and Injuries, simple Surgery and Wound Dressing, provision of Essential Drugs, maternal and Infant Health (Prenatal Consultations, Postnatal Consultations, Births, Baby Weighings, Family Planning, Vaccinations)
- Community participation in healthcare - Comite de Gestion (CoGes): The Community participation in healthcare (based on the Bamako Initiative) is ensured through the election of Community Health Management Committees – Comite de Gestion (CoGes). The responsibilities of the CoGes include: managing the Finances of the CSPS and the Pharmacy, promoting Health Education in the Community, stocking the Pharmacy with Essential Drugs, serving as a Link between the Community and the primary health facilities staff, assuring Accessibility to Primary Healthcare.

== International funding ==
The World Bank approved an $80 million International Development Association (IDA)* grant and $20 million from the Global Financing Facility (GFF) in Support of Every Woman, Every Child, to support the government's efforts to strengthen health services in Burkina Faso. The Governments of Norway and Burkina Faso, the World Bank Group, and the Bill & Melinda Gates Foundation will co-host the GFF replenishment conference slated for November 6, 2018 in Oslo, Norway.

== Health care ==
The national health system includes the public, private and traditional medical and pharmacopoeial sub-sectors. In the area of governance, it has made significant progress both organically and functionally. The main achievements are mainly the strengthening of the decentralization of the health system undertaken since 1993 with the establishment of the district health system (63 districts in 2007) and the development of community health. The effective involvement of all actors in the development of the health system, the introduction of emergency care, the subsidization of benefits for the mother and the child, have improved the efficiency and use of health services. Burkina joined the International Partnership for Health and Related Initiatives (IHP +) in May 2010, which aims to increase resources and efforts for health, as well as the effectiveness of aid in the sector. The financing system of the health sector is mainly based on a tripod consisting of the state budget, external inputs (bilateral and multilateral) and cost recovery of health care and services to users (households). The offer of care is organized around public and private structures. The public sub-sector of care with three levels that provide primary, secondary and tertiary care. Approval of modern medicines (specialty and generic), traditional pharmacopoeial drugs, medical consumables and medical biology reagents is assigned to the Drug Regulatory Directorate (DRP). For each Marketing Authorization (MA) application, a related dossier is evaluated by experts. In 2010, Burkina Faso revised its national health policy and developed a National Health Development Plan [2] covering the period 2011 to 2020. Burkina Faso increased its health care workforce between 2006 and 2010, but not sufficiently to meet the population's growing needs. Burkina Faso suffers from a severe lack of qualified health workers at all levels including support staff. There is less than 1 (0.45) physician per 10,000 people, 3.57 nurses per 10,000 people, and 2.39 midwives per 10,000 (Burkina Faso Ministry of Health, Statistical Yearbook 2010).

== Health status ==
=== Major death risks ===
The top ten causes of death includes :

1. Lower Respiratory Infections 14%
2. Malaria 10%
3. Diarrheal disease 6%
4. Stroke 6%
5. Preterm Birth Complications 4%
6. Ischaemic Heart Disease 4%
7. Meningitis 4%
8. Birth Asphyxia & Birth Trauma 4%
9. Road Injury 3%
10. HIV/AIDS 3%

=== Malaria ===
Malaria remains a major public health issue and is endemic throughout Burkina Faso: according to the Ministry of Health, malaria accounts for 43 percent of consultations with a health provider and 22 percent of deaths.

The duration of the rainy season in Burkina Faso varies across the country with corresponding variances in seasonal malaria transmission based on geographic zones. The principal vectors of malaria in Burkina Faso include three members of the Anopheles gambiae complex: Anopheles gambiae s.s., Anopheles coluzii, and Anopheles arabienesis. In 90 percent of cases, Plasmodium falciparum is responsible for serious and fatal forms of malaria. Insecticide resistance is increasing every year, and the resistance of Anopheles gambiae to insecticides including DDT and pyrethroid classes is evident in many parts of the country.

Burkina Faso's malaria control approach includes three components: improvements in tracking of human illness, parasite surveillance, and effective resource delivery. Significant efforts have been made to stabilize the antimalarial commodity situation. The Government of Burkina Faso recently recruited and trained 17,000 community health workers to support malaria prevention and other health activities, with malaria testing and treatment available in some areas of the country. The increased availability of rapid diagnostic tests, artemisinin-based combination therapies, and injectable artesunate has helped improve malaria case management in health facilities.

=== Other endemic diseases ===
The health situation in Burkina Faso, despite a certain improvement, is still dominated by high morbidity and mortality due to endemic epidemics. The epidemiological profile of the country is marked by the persistence of a high disease burden due to endemic epidemics including HIV infection and by the progressive increase in the burden of noncommunicable diseases. Besides malaria, the major diseases of public health importance are acute respiratory infections, malnutrition, diarrheal diseases, HIV, AIDS, STIs, tuberculosis, leprosy and neglected tropical diseases (river blindness) . In addition, Burkina Faso is regularly confronted with epidemic outbreaks (cerebrospinal meningitis, measles, poliomyelitis). Important prevention efforts by vaccination are made. Noncommunicable diseases are increasing. They include, among others, cardiovascular diseases, mental disorders and diseases, metabolic diseases such as diabetes, malnutrition and other nutritional deficiencies, cancers, genetic diseases and injuries due to road accidents. However, the data collected by the national health information system do not make it possible to assess the extent of these diseases. Some of them are currently the subject of special programs to better control them. The health of vulnerable groups is influenced by these communicable and noncommunicable diseases and remains characterised by high morbidity and mortality.

A recent Dengue fever outbreak in 2017 have killed 18 patients along with 9029 cases. Cases are currently reported in all the 13 health regions of the country, with 60.8% of cases reported in the central region, particularly in the city of Ouagadougou. After this, WHO has recommended timely and adequate management of these cases. WHO recommends that countries should consider the introduction of the dengue vaccine CYD-TDV only in geographic settings (national or subnational) where epidemiological data indicate a high burden of disease.

=== Maternal and child healthcare ===
Child health though improving recently, is still a major problem in Burkina Faso. The country appears at 134th place out of 137 countries ranked in the Child Development Index. the country has seen large reductions in its neonatal, infant, and under-5 mortality rates between 2003 and 2010. Neonatal mortality dropped from 33 to 28 deaths per 1,000 live births, infant mortality dropped from 81 to 65 deaths per 1,000 live births, and under-5 mortality dropped from 184 to 129 deaths per 1,000 live births (INSD and ICF International 2012).These reductions are likely due, in part, to increased access to and utilisation of health services for children under 5 and obstetric services, although issues with the health system remain. The National Nutrition Policy lists malaria, neonatal conditions, acute respiratory infections, and diarrhea as major causes of infant and neonatal mortality and asserts that malnutrition is the underlying cause of 35 percent of infant and child deaths. At age 6, 38% of children had caries, with prevalence higher in urban than rural areas. At age 12, the mean DMFT was 0.7 with prevalence significantly higher among urban than rural children. Other issues faced by children in Burkina Faso are:

- Only 41% of births are attended by trained medical personnel.
- The nutritional status of children under age five is deteriorating. Malnutrition is especially concentrated in the northern regions that border Niger. More than 44 per cent of children suffer delayed or stunted growth.
- Burkina Faso is one of only 12 countries where guinea worm has not yet been eradicated.
- HIV/AIDS continues to spread among young people. An estimated 120,000 children have been orphaned by HIV/AIDS.
- School enrolment rates are very low, especially among girls.
- Almost two thirds of teens and young adults under age 24 are unemployed.
- Many girls are still subjected to genital mutilation, a practice that causes lifelong damage.

Women marry at a young age, have an average of 6 children, and lack control over their fertility, household decision making, and time. Women have less access to land, capital, and farming inputs, which limits their productive capacity and undermines their ability to achieve or adequately support household food security. Only 23 percent of women and 36 percent of men are literate. Among urban women, 52 percent are literate, compared to 11 percent of rural women Burkina Faso's population of more than 20 million persons experiences a high rate of maternal mortality with an average of 341 maternal deaths per 100,000 live births. The lifetime maternal risk of death is still 1 in 44. It is estimated that the majority (80 percent) of these deaths are preventable and 50 percent occur within the first 24 hours after delivery often due to obstetrical complications such as haemorrhage and eclampsia. Certain factors such as shortages of blood also contribute to the overall burden of maternal deaths occurring in health facilities. To reduce maternal mortality and improve the timely notification of maternal deaths, the Burkina Faso Ministry of Health (MOH), in January 2012, introduced the national Maternal Death Surveillance and Response (MDSR) system and guidelines.

== See also ==
- Water supply and sanitation in Burkina Faso
