= Health in Equatorial Guinea =

The Human Rights Measurement Initiative finds that Equatorial Guinea is fulfilling 43.5% of what it should be fulfilling for the right to health based on its level of income. When looking at the right to health with respect to children, Equatorial Guinea achieves 64.4% of what is expected based on its current income. In regards to the right to health amongst the adult population, the country achieves only 58.8% of what is expected based on the nation's level of income. Equatorial Guinea falls into the "very bad" category when evaluating the right to reproductive health because the nation is fulfilling only 7.3% of what the nation is expected to achieve based on the resources (income) it has available.

== Health status ==
Malaria, HIV/AIDS, and pediatrics are major health concerns in Equatorial Guinea.

Equatorial Guinea has three doctors per 10,000 people.

=== Life expectancy ===
The 2018 CIA estimated average life expectancy in Equatorial Guinea for males was 63.8 years and 66.2 years for females for a total population life expectancy of 65 years.

=== HIV/AIDS ===
The HIV/AIDS prevalence was 6.50 per 100 adults in 2017. As of 2017, there were approximately 53,000 people living with HIV/AIDS in the country. There were an estimated 1,800 deaths from AIDS in 2018.

=== Maternal and child healthcare ===
There has been a marked improvement in infant mortality over the past 15 years. In 2018, the infant mortality rate was 63.3 per 1,000 live births. The maternal mortality rate in 2015 was 342 deaths per 100,000 live births.

== Hospitals ==
There are 47 medical facilities in Equatorial Guinea, including seven regional hospitals, eleven district hospitals, and 29 health centre.

Medical facilities in Equatorial Guinea
Name	Location	Type facility	Ref
San Antonio de pale Hospital	Annobón	Regional Hospital	
Bioko Norte 1	Bioko Norte	Health Centre	
Bioko Norte 2	Bioko Norte	Health Centre	
Bioko Norte 3	Bioko Norte	Health Centre	
Bioko Norte 4	Bioko Norte	Health Centre	
Bioko Sur 1	Bioko Sur	Health Centre	
Centro Sur 1	Centro Sur	Health Centre	
Centro Sur 2	Centro Sur	Health Centre	
Centro Sur 3	Centro Sur	Health Centre	
Centro Sur 4	Centro Sur	Health Centre	
Aconibe District Hospital	Continental Region	District Hospital	
Akurenam District Hospital	Continental Region	District Hospital	
Anisok District Hospital	Continental Region	District Hospital	
Bata Public Regional Hospital	Continental Region	Regional Hospital	
Cogo District Hospital	Continental Region	District Hospital	
Ebebiyin Provincial Hospital	Continental Region	Regional Hospital	
Evinayong Provincial Hospital	Continental Region	Regional Hospital	
Malabo Public Regional Hospital	Continental Region	Regional Hospital	
Mbini District Hospital	Continental Region	District Hospital	
Mikomeseng District Hospital	Continental Region	District Hospital	
Mongomo Provincial Hospital	Continental Region	Regional Hospital	
Niefang District Hospital	Continental Region	District Hospital	
Nsoc Nsomo District Hospital	Continental Region	District Hospital	
Nsork District Hospital	Continental Region	District Hospital	
Kientem 1	Kientem	Health Centre	
Kientem 2	Kientem	Health Centre	
Kientem 3	Kientem	Health Centre	
Kientem 4	Kientem	Health Centre	
Kientem 5	Kientem	Health Centre	
Kientem 6	Kientem	Health Centre	
Kientem 7	Kientem	Health Centre	
Kientem 8	Kientem	Health Centre	
Litoral 1	Litoral	Health Centre	
Litoral 2	Litoral	Health Centre	
Litoral 3	Litoral	Health Centre	
Litoral 4	Litoral	Health Centre	
Litoral 5	Litoral	Health Centre	
Litoral 6	Litoral	Health Centre	
Baney District Hospital	Malabo Island	District Hospital	
Luba Provincial Hospital	Malabo Island	Regional Hospital	
Riaba District Hospital	Malabo Island	District Hospital	
Welenzas 1	Wele-Nzas	Health Centre	
Welenzas 2	Wele-Nzas	Health Centre	
Welenzas 3	Wele-Nzas	Health Centre	
Welenzas 4	Wele-Nzas	Health Centre	
Welenzas 5	Wele-Nzas	Health Centre	
Welenzas 6	Wele-Nzas	Health Centre	
