= Health spending as percent of gross domestic product (GDP) by country =

World map of total annual healthcare expenditure by country as a share of GDP.

This article includes 2 lists of countries of the world and their total expenditure on health as a percent of national gross domestic product (GDP). GDP is a measure of the total economy of a nation. Total expenditure includes both public and private health expenditures. See also: List of countries by total health expenditure per capita.

The first table uses OECD data and lists member countries of the Organisation for Economic Co-operation and Development (OECD), and a few other countries. The first table lists member countries of the Organisation for Economic Co-operation and Development (OECD).

The next table lists nearly all countries. It uses data from the World Health Organization (WHO).

== Organization for Economic Co-operation and Development ==
A country list from OECD Data at Organisation for Economic Co-operation and Development. OECD member countries and some other countries.

=== Table 1 ===
Area links below are "Healthcare in Area" links.

Total health spending as a percent of GDP (gross domestic product)
Areas	2024	2023	2022	2021	2020
Argentina	..	10.4	10.5	11.1	10.7
Australia	10.3	9.9	9.9	10.5	10.7
Austria	11.8	11.2	11.2	12.2	11.4
Belgium	11	10.8	10.7	11.3	11.5
Brazil	..	..	9.4	9.6	9.6
Bulgaria	..	7.9	7.6	8.6	8.4
Canada	11.3	11.2	11.1	12.4	13
Chile	10.5	10.2	10	9.7	9.7
China	..	..	5.2	5.3	5.5
Colombia	8.1	8.2	7.6	9.1	8.7
Costa Rica	6.8	6.9	7.2	7.6	7.8
Croatia	..	7.1	7.3	8.1	7.7
Cyprus	..	8.1	9	9.5	8.8
Czech Republic	8.5	8.4	8.5	9.2	9
Denmark	9.4	9.5	9.5	10.7	10.7
Estonia	7.8	7.5	6.9	7.5	7.5
Finland	10.6	10.5	9.7	9.9	9.7
France	11.5	11.5	11.8	12.2	12.1
Germany	12.3	11.7	12.4	12.7	12.5
Greece	8.1	8.4	8.4	9	9.4
Hungary	6.5	6.4	6.6	7.3	7.2
Iceland	9	8.7	9.1	9.7	9.6
India	..	..	3.3	3.3	3.3
Indonesia	..	2.7	2.7	3.7	3.4
Ireland	6.9	6.6	6	6.4	7
Israel	7.6	7.1	7.1	7.8	7.7
Italy	8.4	8.4	8.9	9.3	9.6
Japan	10.6	10.7	12.3	12.1	11.5
Korea	8.4	8.5	8.8	8.3	8
Latvia	7.6	7.3	8.1	9.4	7.5
Lithuania	7.6	7.3	7.2	7.7	7.4
Luxembourg	5.9	5.7	5.6	5.6	5.8
Malta	..	8.8	9.8	10.6	10.7
Mexico	5.9	5.7	5.7	5.9	6.1
Netherlands	10	9.8	10	11.1	11
New Zealand	10.1	10.1	10.6	9.6	9.3
Norway	9.7	9.4	7.9	9.8	11.4
Peru	..	5.6	6.1	6.7	6.3
Poland	8.1	7.1	6.5	6.4	6.4
Portugal	10.2	10	10.5	11.2	10.5
Romania	..	5.7	5.8	6.5	6.2
Slovakia	8.4	7.4	7.7	7.6	7.1
Slovenia	9.9	9.3	9.6	9.5	9.5
South Africa	..	..	8.7	8.7	9
Spain	9.2	9.2	9.7	10.3	10.8
Sweden	11.3	11.3	10.9	11.3	11.4
Switzerland	11.8	11.7	11.6	12	12
Thailand	..	4.5	5.4	5.2	4.4
Turkey	4.7	4.3	3.7	4.6	4.6
Ukraine	..	..	..	8.2	7.6
United Kingdom	11.1	11	11.1	12.1	12.1
United States	17.2	16.7	16.5	17.4	18.5

=== Bar chart and graphs ===
Health spending by OECD country, and some other countries. Percent of GDP (gross domestic product).

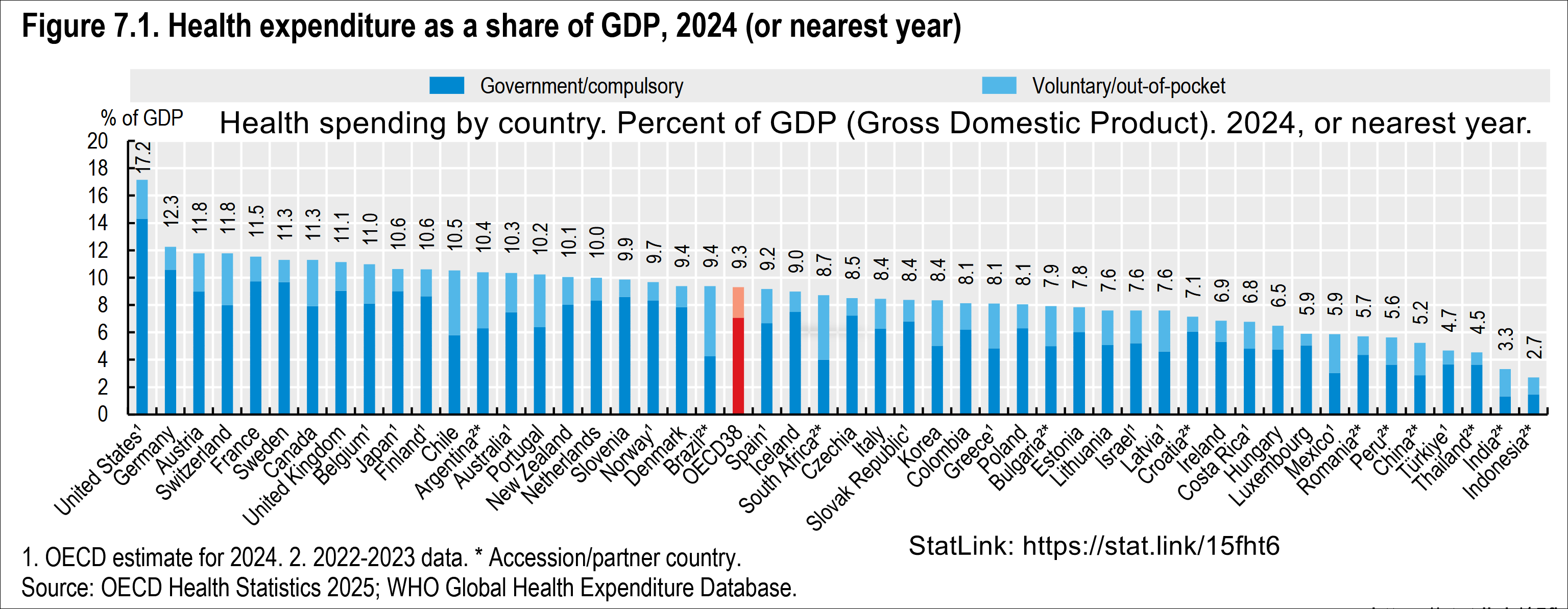
Click to enlarge.

Life expectancy vs healthcare spending of rich OECD countries. US average of $10,447 in 2018. See: list of countries by life expectancy.

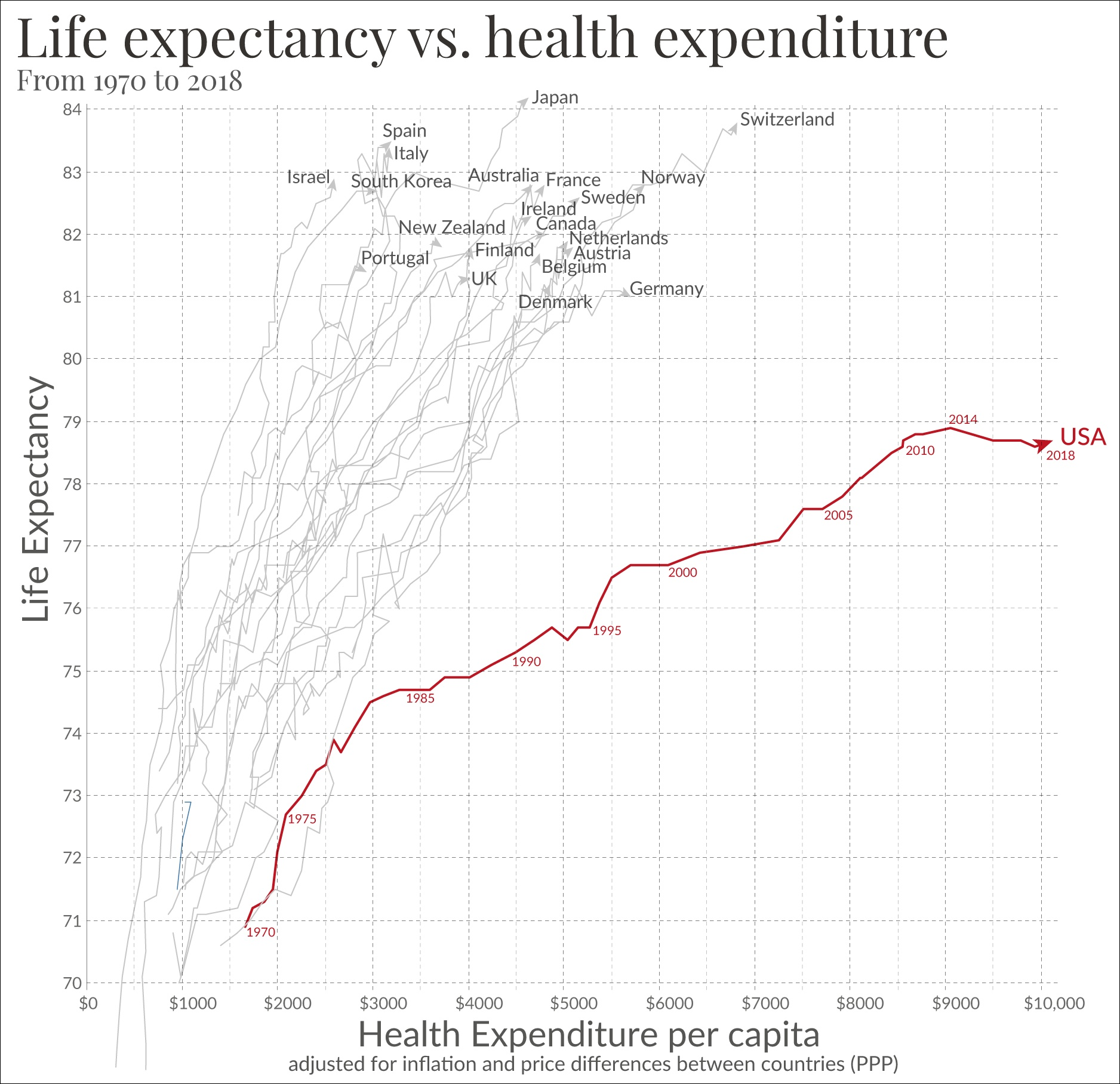

Health care cost as percent of GDP over time for a few OECD countries.

== World Health Organization ==
A country list from World Health Organization's Global Health Expenditure Database. Years were selected to get the latest year for these 5 countries included in the table: Albania, Libya, Saudi Arabia, Syria, Yemen.

=== Table 2 ===
Asterisk (*) indicates "Healthcare in <location>" or "Health in <location>" links.

Total health spending as a percent of GDP (gross domestic product)
Location	2011	2012	2014	2018	2020	2021
Afghanistan *	8.6	7.9	9.5	14.2	15.5	16.8
Albania *	6.1	6.1	6.4	6.7		
Algeria *	5.3	6.0	6.5	6.2	6.3	
Andorra *	7.7	6.7	6.8	7.4	9.1	
Angola *	2.6	2.4	2.4	2.6	2.9	
Antigua and Barbuda *	5.4	5.5	5.9	4.8	5.6	
Argentina *	9.4	9.8	9.7	9.5	10.0	
Armenia *	9.4	9.1	10.2	10.0	12.2	
Australia *	8.5	8.7	9.8	10.1	10.6	
Austria *	10.0	10.2	10.4	10.3	11.5	12.2
Azerbaijan *	2.4	3.0	3.4	3.6	4.6	
Bahamas	5.3	5.3	5.6	6.0	7.6	
Bahrain *	3.9	4.1	4.4	4.1	4.7	
Bangladesh *	2.8	2.8	2.7	2.7	2.6	
Barbados *	6.9	7.8	7.0	6.6	7.2	
Belarus *	4.9	5.2	5.4	5.5	6.4	
Belgium *	10.4	10.5	10.6	10.8	11.1	
Belize *	5.7	5.4	6.2	5.8	6.9	
Benin *	3.1	3.4	2.7	2.5	2.6	
Bhutan *	3.3	3.6	3.6	3.2	4.4	
Bolivia *	5.2	5.3	5.9	6.6	7.9	
Bosnia and Herzegovina *	9.2	9.5	9.5	8.9	9.8	
Botswana *	5.9	6.4	5.9	6.0	6.2	
Brazil *	7.8	7.7	8.4	9.5	10.3	
Brunei *	1.9	1.9	1.9	2.4	2.4	
Bulgaria *	7.1	7.5	7.7	7.3	8.5	
Burkina Faso *	4.6	4.6	5.0	5.0	6.7	
Burundi *	10.1	8.5	7.2	7.4	6.5	
Cape Verde *	4.3	5.1	5.3	5.2	6.0	
Cambodia *	7.5	7.3	6.7	6.1	7.5	
Cameroon *	3.9	3.9	3.8	3.6	3.8	
Canada *	10.4	10.5	10.3	10.8	12.9	11.7
Central African Republic *	3.7	3.9	4.6	11.0	9.4	
Chad *	3.9	3.9	4.3	4.6	5.4	
Chile *	6.8	7.0	7.8	9.2	9.8	9.1
China *	4.3	4.6	4.8	5.2	5.6	
Colombia *	6.8	6.7	7.2	7.6	9.0	
Comoros *	5.3	5.2	5.2	4.9	5.3	
Congo *	1.8	1.9	2.0	1.9	4.5	
Cook Islands	3.6	3.2	3.3	2.7	3.2	
Costa Rica *	8.1	7.8	7.7	7.3	7.9	
Croatia *	7.7	7.7	6.6	6.8	7.8	
Cuba *	11.3	9.3	12.1	11.0	12.5	
Cyprus *	6.4	6.6	7.0	6.8	8.1	
Czech Republic *	6.9	7.0	7.6	7.5	9.2	
Denmark *	10.4	10.5	10.3	10.1	10.5	10.8
Djibouti *	3.4	3.3	3.0	2.3	2.0	
Dominica *	5.3	5.8	5.3	6.1	5.6	
Dominican Republic *	5.0	5.0	4.8	4.1	4.9	
DR Congo *	3.3	3.3	4.0	3.3	4.1	
Timor-Leste *	6.9	7.0	7.6	6.3	9.9	
Ecuador *	6.5	6.8	6.7	7.9	8.5	
Egypt *	4.4	4.7	5.0	5.0	4.4	
El Salvador *	8.9	8.6	8.6	8.3	9.9	
Equatorial Guinea *	1.6	1.3	2.2	3.1	3.8	
Eritrea *	5.2	3.8	4.1	4.1	4.1	
Estonia *	5.8	5.8	6.4	6.7	7.8	7.5
Eswatini *	8.5	7.8	7.3	7.2	6.5	
Ethiopia *	4.5	4.5	4.0	3.3	3.5	
Fiji *	3.1	3.3	3.4	3.6	3.7	
Finland *	9.2	9.6	9.8	9.0	9.6	
France *	11.2	11.3	11.5	11.2	12.2	
Gabon *	2.6	2.4	2.5	2.7	3.4	
Gambia	4.4	4.3	3.1	3.3	2.6	
Georgia *	8.0	8.0	7.9	7.1	7.6	
Germany *	10.8	10.9	11.0	11.5	12.8	12.8
Ghana *	4.7	4.0	4.0	3.4	4.0	
Greece *	9.2	8.9	7.9	8.1	9.5	
Grenada *	5.8	5.8	4.8	4.6	5.8	
Guatemala *	6.0	6.1	5.9	6.1	6.5	
Guinea *	3.8	3.5	4.8	3.7	4.0	
Guinea-Bissau *	6.2	5.9	10.0	7.6	8.4	
Guyana *	4.2	3.7	3.9	4.9	5.5	
Haiti *	5.9	5.6	4.5	4.3	3.2	
Honduras *	8.8	8.7	7.9	7.2	9.0	9.1
Hungary *	7.5	7.4	7.0	6.6	7.3	
Iceland *	8.2	8.2	8.2	8.4	9.6	9.7
India *	3.2	3.3	3.6	2.9	3.0	
Indonesia *	3.0	2.9	3.0	2.9	3.4	
Iran *	6.1	6.1	6.4	7.5	5.3	
Iraq *	2.8	2.7	2.8	4.1	5.1	
Ireland *	10.6	10.6	9.5	6.9	7.1	6.7
Israel *	7.0	7.1	7.1	7.3	8.3	
Italy *	8.8	8.8	8.9	8.7	9.6	9.5
Ivory Coast *	4.4	4.4	3.7	3.1	3.7	
Jamaica *	5.2	4.9	5.2	6.0	6.6	
Japan *	10.5	10.7	10.7	10.7	10.9	
Jordan *	8.1	7.8	7.2	7.8	7.5	
Kazakhstan *	2.6	3.0	3.0	2.8	3.8	
Kenya *	5.2	5.0	4.9	4.1	4.3	
Kiribati *	8.6	8.6	10.0	11.9	11.6	
Kuwait *	2.3	2.3	2.9	5.2	6.3	
Kyrgyzstan *	7.1	8.5	7.4	5.0	5.3	
Laos *	1.9	2.1	2.3	2.2	2.7	
Latvia *	5.7	5.4	5.5	6.2	7.4	
Lebanon *	8.2	7.0	7.5	8.0	8.0	
Lesotho *	9.5	9.2	9.1	11.0	11.8	
Liberia *	9.4	8.8	9.2	9.8	9.5	
Libya *	6.1					
Lithuania *	6.5	6.3	6.2	6.5	7.5	7.9
Luxembourg *	6.0	5.3	5.2	5.3	5.8	5.4
Madagascar *	4.4	3.8	4.4	4.3	3.9	
Malawi *	5.3	6.0	6.9	6.9	5.4	
Malaysia *	3.3	3.5	3.7	3.8	4.1	
Maldives *	7.9	8.7	7.9	7.4	11.3	
Mali *	4.0	3.8	4.5	3.7	4.3	
Malta *	8.4	8.4	9.1	8.6	10.8	
Marshall Islands *	13.1	13.0	13.2	15.3	13.0	
Mauritania *	2.5	2.6	3.5	3.4	3.4	
Mauritius *	4.3	4.3	5.5	5.9	6.7	
Mexico *	5.5	5.7	5.6	5.4	6.2	
Federated States of Micronesia *	13.1	12.3	11.7	11.7	11.6	
Moldova *	9.1	9.1	8.6	6.6	6.8	
Monaco *	2.2	2.2	2.1	1.6	1.7	
Mongolia *	3.6	3.9	4.2	3.8	4.9	
Montenegro *	8.0	8.3	8.0	8.3	11.4	
Morocco *	5.8	5.8	5.9	5.3	6.0	
Mozambique *	5.0	5.2	6.3	8.1	7.6	
Myanmar *	1.9	2.4	4.4	4.9	4.6	
Namibia *	9.8	9.3	8.4	8.3	8.9	
Nauru *	9.8	9.2	7.9	11.7	12.0	
Nepal *	4.4	4.5	5.1	4.5	5.2	
Netherlands	10.2	10.5	10.6	10.0	11.1	11.2
New Zealand *	9.5	9.7	9.4	9.0	10.0	
Nicaragua *	7.4	7.5	8.0	8.5	8.6	
Niger *	4.9	4.3	4.5	5.3	6.2	
Nigeria *	3.3	3.4	3.3	3.1	3.4	
Niue	19.8	10.3	10.8	8.3	7.8	
North Macedonia *	6.5	6.6	6.3	6.5	7.9	
Norway *	8.8	8.8	9.3	10.0	11.4	10.1
Oman *	2.5	2.6	3.6	3.7	5.3	
Pakistan *	2.1	2.2	2.5	2.8	3.0	
Palau	10.8	11.6	12.3	11.2	18.4	
Panama *	7.1	6.7	7.2	7.9	9.7	
Papua New Guinea *	2.3	2.7	3.3	2.3	2.5	
Paraguay *	5.8	6.5	6.6	6.7	7.6	
Peru *	4.5	4.7	5.0	5.2	6.3	
Philippines *	4.0	4.2	3.7	4.0	5.1	5.6
Poland *	6.2	6.2	6.4	6.3	6.5	6.6
Portugal *	9.7	9.7	9.3	9.4	10.5	11.2
Qatar *	1.6	1.7	2.4	3.3	4.2	
Romania *	4.7	4.7	5.0	5.6	6.3	
Russia *	4.8	4.9	5.2	5.4	7.6	
Rwanda *	7.9	8.1	7.0	6.7	7.3	
Saint Kitts and Nevis *	5.2	5.0	4.7	4.9	5.4	
Saint Lucia *	5.1	5.0	4.8	4.4	6.7	
Saint Vincent and the Grenadines *	4.2	4.5	4.2	4.1	4.8	
Samoa *	5.4	5.1	6.6	5.1	5.3	
San Marino *	8.2	9.2	8.5	8.5	8.7	
São Tomé and Príncipe *	6.8	6.5	6.7	5.8	4.9	
Saudi Arabia *	3.7	4.0	5.2	5.5		
Senegal *	4.2	4.3	4.4	4.4	5.2	
Serbia *	9.1	9.3	9.2	8.5	8.7	
Seychelles *	4.8	5.7	4.6	5.0	6.4	
Sierra Leone *	13.3	10.6	19.7	8.3	8.8	
Singapore *	3.2	3.3	3.9	4.1	6.1	
Slovakia *	7.3	7.6	6.9	6.7	7.2	
Slovenia *	8.5	8.7	8.5	8.3	9.5	9.2
Solomon Islands *	5.0	4.9	4.9	3.9	4.4	
South Africa *	7.9	8.0	7.9	8.1	8.6	
South Korea *	6.0	6.1	6.5	7.5	8.4	
South Sudan *				6.3	5.3	
Spain *	9.2	9.2	9.1	9.0	10.7	
Sri Lanka *	3.7	3.4	3.6	3.9	4.1	
Sudan *	5.6	5.7	5.7	4.5	3.0	
Suriname *	4.4	4.3	4.5	6.7	6.8	
Sweden *	10.4	10.7	10.9	10.9	11.4	11.3
Switzerland *	10.0	10.2	10.6	11.4	11.8	
Syria *	2.5	3.0				
Tajikistan *	5.9	6.0	6.7	7.0	8.2	
Thailand *	3.6	3.5	3.7	3.9	4.4	
Togo *	4.6	4.8	5.1	6.0	6.0	
Tonga *	3.8	4.8	5.0	4.8	5.3	
Trinidad and Tobago *	4.7	4.9	5.2	6.7	7.3	
Tunisia *	6.1	6.3	6.5	5.9	6.3	
Turkey *	4.7	4.4	4.3	4.1	4.6	
Turkmenistan *	3.2	3.4	4.3	5.7	5.7	
Tuvalu *	14.1	13.6	14.7	18.2	21.5	
Uganda *	6.7	6.1	5.3	4.0	4.0	
Ukraine *	6.8	7.1	7.2	7.5	7.6	
United Arab Emirates *	3.7	3.4	3.6	4.1	5.7	
United Kingdom *	9.9	9.9	9.8	9.7	12.0	11.9
Tanzania *	5.1	5.0	4.0	4.2	3.7	
United States *	16.1	16.1	16.2	16.6	18.8	
Uruguay *	7.9	8.1	8.1	9.0	9.2	
Uzbekistan *	5.3	5.5	4.4	5.1	6.7	
Vanuatu *	3.6	3.9	3.6	3.3	4.0	
Venezuela *	7.2	6.4	5.8	2.4	3.8	
Vietnam *	4.6	5.0	4.6	5.0	4.7	
Yemen *	4.8	5.2	4.8			
Zambia *	3.5	3.9	3.8	5.1	5.6	
Zimbabwe *	8.1	6.9	8.1	4.7	3.4	

== See also ==
- Health system
- Health care systems by country
- List of countries by hospital beds
- List of countries by infant and under-five mortality rate
- List of countries by maternal mortality ratio
- List of countries by total health expenditure by type of financing
