= World Health Organization ranking of health systems in 2000 =

Ranking of national health systems

The World Health Organization (WHO) ranked the health systems of its 191 member states in its World Health Report 2000. It provided a framework and measurement approach to examine and compare aspects of health systems around the world. It developed a series of performance indicators to assess the overall level and distribution of health in the populations, and the responsiveness and financing of health care services. It was the organization's first ever analysis of the world's health systems.

== Ranking ==
Country	Attainment of goals / Health / Level (DALE)	Attainment of goals / Health / Distribution	Attainment of goals / Health / Overall goal attainment	Health expenditure per capita in international dollars	Performance / On level of health	Performance / Overall health system performance
Afghanistan	164	0	183	184	150	173
Albania	102	128	86	149	64	55
Algeria	44	63	56	24	45	81
Andorra	10	25	17	23	7	4
Angola	165	178	181	164	165	181
Antigua and Barbuda	48	58	71	56	123	86
Argentina	39	60	49	34	71	75
Armenia	41	63	81	102	56	104
Australia	2	17	12	17	39	32
Austria	17	8	10	6	15	9
Azerbaijan	65	99	103	162	60	109
Bahamas	109	67	64	22	137	98
Bahrain	61	72	58	48	30	42
Bangladesh	140	125	131	144	103	88
Barbados	53	36	38	36	87	46
Belarus	83	46	53	74	116	72
Belgium	16	26	13	15	28	21
Belize	94	95	104	88	34	69
Benin	157	132	143	171	136	97
Bhutan	138	158	144	135	73	124
Bolivia	133	118	117	101	142	126
Bosnia-Herzegovina	56	79	79	105	70	90
Botswana	187	146	168	85	188	169
Brazil	111	108	125	54	78	125
Brunei	59	42	37	32	76	40
Bulgaria	60	53	74	96	92	102
Burkina Faso	178	137	159	173	162	132
Burundi	179	154	161	186	171	143
Cambodia	148	150	166	140	157	174
Cameroon	156	160	163	131	172	164
Canada	12	18	7	10	35	30
Cape Verde	118	123	126	150	55	113
Central African Republic	175	189	190	178	164	189
Chad	161	175	177	175	161	178
Chile	32	1	33	44	23	33
People's Republic of China	81	101	132	139	61	144
Colombia	74	44	41	49	51	22
Comoros	146	143	137	165	141	118
Congo	150	142	155	122	167	166
Cook Islands	67	92	88	61	95	107
Costa Rica	40	45	45	50	25	36
Croatia	38	33	36	56	57	43
Cuba	33	41	40	118	36	39
Cyprus	25	31	28	39	22	24
Czech Republic	35	19	30	40	81	48
Democratic Republic of the Congo	174	174	179	188	185	188
Denmark	28	21	20	8	65	34
Djibouti	166	169	170	163	163	157
Dominica	26	35	42	70	59	35
Dominican Republic	79	97	66	92	42	51
Ecuador	93	133	107	97	96	111
Egypt	115	141	110	115	43	63
El Salvador	87	115	122	83	37	115
Equatorial Guinea	152	151	152	129	174	171
Eritrea	169	167	176	187	148	158
Estonia	69	43	48	60	115	77
Ethiopia	182	176	186	189	169	180
Federated States of Micronesia	104	112	111	81	110	123
Fiji	106	71	78	87	124	96
Finland	20	27	22	18	44	31
France	3	12	6	4	4	1
Gabon	144	136	141	95	143	139
Gambia	143	155	153	158	109	146
(Georgia (country)) Georgia	44	61	76	125	84	114
Germany	22	20	14	3	41	25
Ghana	149	149	139	166	158	135
Greece	7	6	23	30	11	14
Grenada	49	82	68	67	49	85
Guatemala	129	106	113	130	99	78
Guinea	167	166	172	159	160	161
Guinea-Bissau	170	177	180	156	156	176
Guyana	98	126	116	109	104	128
Haiti	153	152	145	155	139	138
Honduras	92	119	129	100	48	131
Hungary	62	40	43	59	105	66
Iceland	19	24	16	14	27	15
India	19	13	121	133	118	112
Indonesia	103	156	106	154	90	92
Iran	96	113	114	94	58	93
Iraq	126	130	124	117	75	103
(Republic of Ireland) Ireland	27	13	25	25	32	19
Israel	23	7	24	19	40	28
Italy	6	14	11	11	3	2
Ivory Coast	155	181	157	153	133	137
Jamaica	36	87	69	89	8	53
Japan	1	3	1	13	9	10
Jordan	101	83	84	98	100	83
Kazakhstan	122	52	62	112	135	64
Kenya	162	135	142	152	178	140
Kiribati	125	121	123	103	144	142
Kuwait	68	54	46	41	68	45
Kyrgyzstan	123	122	135	146	134	151
Laos	147	147	154	157	155	165
Latvia	82	56	67	77	121	105
Lebanon	95	88	93	46	97	91
Lesotho	171	164	173	123	186	183
Liberia	181	191	187	181	176	186
Libya	107	102	97	84	94	87
Lithuania	63	48	52	71	93	73
Luxembourg	18	22	5	5	31	16
Macedonia	64	85	89	106	69	89
Madagascar	172	168	167	190	173	159
Malawi	189	187	182	161	187	185
Malaysia	89	49	55	93	86	49
Maldives	130	134	128	76	147	147
Mali	183	180	178	179	170	163
Malta	21	38	31	37	2	5
Marshall Islands	121	120	119	80	140	141
Mauritania	158	163	169	141	151	162
Mauritius	78	77	90	69	113	84
Mexico	55	65	51	55	63	61
Moldova	88	64	91	108	106	101
Monaco	9	30	18	12	12	13
Mongolia	131	148	136	145	138	145
Morocco	110	111	94	99	17	29
Mozambique	180	190	185	160	168	184
Myanmar	139	162	175	136	129	190
Namibia	177	173	165	66	189	168
Nauru	136	51	75	42	166	98
Nepal	142	161	160	170	98	150
Netherlands	13	15	8	9	19	17
New Zealand	31	16	26	20	80	41
Nicaragua	117	96	101	104	74	71
Niger	190	184	188	185	177	170
Nigeria	163	188	184	176	175	187
Niue	85	100	102	127	108	121
North Korea	137	145	149	172	153	167
Norway	15	4	3	16	18	11
Oman	72	59	59	62	1	8
Pakistan	124	183	133	142	85	122
Palau	112	66	63	47	125	82
Panama	47	93	70	53	67	95
Papua New Guinea	145	157	150	137	146	148
Paraguay	71	57	73	91	52	57
Peru	105	103	115	78	119	129
Philippines	113	50	54	124	126	60
Poland	45	5	34	58	89	50
Portugal	29	34	32	28	13	12
Qatar	66	55	47	27	53	44
Romania	80	78	72	107	111	99
Russia	91	69	100	75	127	130
Rwanda	185	185	171	177	181	172
Saint Kitts and Nevis	86	91	98	51	122	100
Saint Lucia	54	86	87	86	54	68
Saint Vincent and the Grenadines	43	89	92	90	38	74
Samoa	97	81	82	121	131	119
San Marino	11	9	21	21	5	3
Sao Tome and Principe	132	139	138	167	117	133
Saudi Arabia	58	70	61	63	10	26
Senegal	151	105	118	143	132	59
Seychelles	108	73	83	52	83	56
Sierra Leone	191	186	191	183	183	191
Singapore	30	29	27	38	14	6
Slovakia	42	39	39	45	88	62
Slovenia	34	23	29	29	62	38
Solomon Islands	127	117	108	134	20	80
Somalia	173	179	189	191	154	179
South Africa	160	128	151	57	182	175
South Korea	51	37	35	31	107	58
Spain	5	11	19	24	6	7
Sri Lanka	76	80	80	138	66	76
Sudan	154	159	148	169	149	134
Suriname	77	94	105	72	77	110
Swaziland	164	140	164	116	184	177
Sweden	4	28	4	7	21	23
Switzerland	8	10	2	2	26	20
Syria	114	107	112	119	91	108
Tajikistan	120	124	127	126	145	154
Tanzania	176	172	158	174	180	156
Thailand	99	74	57	64	102	47
Togo	159	170	156	180	159	152
Tonga	75	84	85	73	114	116
Trinidad and Tobago	57	75	56	65	79	67
Tunisia	90	114	77	79	46	52
Turkey	73	109	96	82	33	70
Turkmenistan	128	131	130	128	152	153
Tuvalu	119	116	120	151	128	136
United Arab Emirates	50	62	44	35	16	27
Uganda	186	138	162	168	179	149
United Kingdom	14	2	9	26	24	18
Ukraine	70	47	60	111	101	79
United States	24	32	15	1	72	37
Uruguay	37	68	50	33	50	65
Uzbekistan	100	144	109	120	112	117
Vanuatu	135	127	134	132	120	127
Venezuela	52	76	65	68	29	54
Vietnam	116	104	140	147	130	160
Yemen	141	165	146	182	82	120
FR Yugoslavia	46	90	95	113	47	106
Zambia	188	171	174	148	190	182
Zimbabwe	184	98	147	110	191	155

== Methodology ==
The rankings are based on an index of five factors:

- Health (50%) : disability-adjusted life expectancy
  - Overall or average : 25%
  - Distribution or equality : 25%
- Responsiveness (25%) : speed of service, protection of privacy, and quality of amenities
  - Overall or average : 12.5%
  - Distribution or equality : 12.5%
- Fair financial contribution : 25%

== Criticism ==
The WHO rankings are claimed to have been subject to many and varied criticisms since its publication. Concerns raised over the five factors considered, data sets used and comparison methodologies have led health bodies and political commentators in most of the countries on the list to question the efficacy of its results and validity of any conclusions drawn. Such criticisms of a broad endeavour by the WHO to rank all the world's healthcare systems must also however be understood in the context of a predisposition to analytical bias commensurate with an individual nation's demographics, socio-economics and politics. In considering such a disparate global spectrum, ranking criteria, methodology, results and conclusions will always be an area for contention.

In over a decade of discussion and controversy over the WHO Ranking of 2000, there is still no consensus about how an objective world health system ranking should be compiled. Indeed, the 2000 results have proved so controversial that the WHO declined to rank countries in their World Health Reports since 2000, but the debate still rages on. With burgeoning and ageing populations, spiralling costs and the recognition by most national governments that constant vigilance and periodic healthcare reform are necessary, the appetite for a means of measuring national performance in broader world contexts is ever increasing and all the more relevant. With this in mind, and in lieu of any further ranking information from the WHO since 2000, there are many analytical bodies now looking at national healthcare delivery in global contexts and publishing their findings. Bloomberg finds "the U.S. spends the most on health care on a relative cost basis with the worst outcome" and notes Cubans live longer than Americans, but Americans pay more than fourteen times as much for less effective health care. The Commonwealth Fund ranked seven developed countries on health care, the US ranked lowest (AU, CA, DE, NL, NZ, UK, US).

== See also ==
- Health systems – explains in some depth the concept of healthcare and its delivery on national and international scales
- International comparisons of health systems – a section of the above article specifically about international comparisons
- Healthcare subjects – a list of subjects detailing the complexities behind global healthcare delivery
- List of countries by quality of healthcare
