= Drug policy of Portugal =

The drug policy of Portugal, informally called the drug strategy, was put in place in 2000, and came into effect in July 2001. Created by the Decree-Law n. 130 -A/2001 and under the jurisdiction of the Commissions for the Dissuasion of Drug Addiction, its purpose was to reduce the number of new HIV/AIDS cases in the country, as it was estimated around half of new cases came from injection drug use. This new approach focused on public health as opposed to public-order priorities by decriminalizing public and private use and possession of all drugs. Under this new policy when the police encounter individuals using or in possession of drugs, the substance is confiscated and the individual is referred to a Dissuasion Commission.

The policy consisted of multiple methods to reduce the spread of HIV, among which were harm reduction efforts, information to the public and in particular to populations most at risk about how HIV is spread, establishing treatment facilities and easier access to substitution treatment for drug addicts, establishing so-called dissuasion commissions to persuade drug addicts to go into treatment, and all drug treatment and control units were reorganized into one comprehensive unit. In addition, the existing practice of giving drug addicts a waiver for drug possession was codified in a new law. The law (Drug Law 30/2000) maintained the status of illegality for using or possessing any drug for personal use without authorization. However, for persons addicted to said drug, their case was now deemed an administrative offence. The authority to impose penalties or sanctions in these cases was transferred from the police and justice system to so-called dissuasion commissions if the amount possessed was no more than a ten-day supply of that substance.

== Drug use in Portugal prior to 1999 ==
Portugal's first major drug laws were enacted in 1924 and 1926, mainly incorporating into domestic law through the International Opium Convention. In 1970, the country's drug law underwent a major update, with the introduction of a legal definition of narcotic products, a drug schedule, and legal regime for punishing drug trafficking and consumption. Drug use and abuse expanded in the early and mid-1970s, gradually becoming a major societal problem. The 1963 Mental Health Act made reference to the need of facilities for treating drug abuse, but there was no nationwide coverage nor a coordinating structure to achieve so. Following the ratification of the Single Convention on Narcotic Drugs (in December 1971) and of the Convention on Psychotropic Substances (in April 1979), Portuguese drug law underwent a new major update in 1983, harshening the fight against drug trafficking and criminal organisations, and softening the penalties for drug consumption, in order to incentivise users to voluntarily seek medical treatment. Concurrently, in the 1970s and 1980s, the Portuguese government created a series of organizations to study and reduce drug use, including the Drug Fighting Coordination Office (GCCD), the Drug Prophylaxis Studies Center (CEPD), and the Drug Control and Research Center (CICD). In the 1990s, heroin use skyrocketed, resulting in high levels of drug addiction and the spread of the AIDS epidemic. Estimates for the late 1990s determined there were between fifty and sixty thousand drug addicts out of a population of 10 million. This resulted in a public health crisis in Portugal, paving the way for a paradigm-shifting approach to approach drug use as a health crisis instead of a criminal one.

== Status in 1999 ==
In 1999, Portugal had the highest rate of HIV amongst injecting drug users in the European Union. There were 2,000 new cases a year, in a country of 10 million people. In 1997, 45% of HIV reported AIDS cases recorded originated among IV drug users, so targeting drug use was seen as an effective avenue of HIV prevention. The number of heroin users was estimated to be between 50,000 and 100,000 at the end of the 1990s. This led to the adoption of The National Strategy for the Fight Against Drugs (NSFAD) in 1999. A vast expansion of harm reduction efforts, doubling the investment of public funds in drug treatment and drug prevention services, and changing the legal framework dealing with minor drug offences were the main elements of the policy thrust.

According to Dr João Castel-Branco Goulão, one of the architects of the decriminalisation policy, a reason why the programme was able to get off the ground was because in Portugal, the problem could not be blamed on any ethnic or economic group in society (as in Brazil and the favelas), allowing other prejudices to be put aside. The policy was, however, initially opposed by right-wing politicians, who feared it would turn Portugal into a narco-state.

== Harm reduction ==
The needle exchange programme, "Say NO! to a used syringe", is a nationwide syringe exchange program which has been ongoing since October 1993, involving some 2,500 pharmacies throughout Portugal. It is run by the National Commission for the Fight against AIDS - set up by the Ministry of Health and the National Association of Pharmacies - a non-governmental organisation representing the majority of Portuguese pharmacies. All drug users can exchange used syringes at pharmacy counters across the country. They get a kit with clean needle syringes, a condom, rubbing alcohol and a written message motivating for AIDS prevention and addiction treatment. From 1994 to 1999, pharmacies delivered around three million syringes annually.

Several low threshold projects were initiated after 1999, particularly in the period of 2003 to 2005, where outreach teams have promoted safe injection practices and supplied needles and injecting equipment on the street. Many of these projects are still running.

At programme start, a media campaign was launched by television, radio and the press, and posters were put up in discothèques and bars in order to attract the attention of the target population to the problems associated with drug addiction, in particular HIV transmission through needle-sharing.

Project objectives have been threefold: To reduce frequency of sharing needles and syringes, to change other IDU (Intravenous Drug User) behaviors that create negative attitudes among the population in general, and to change attitudes towards IDUs in the general population to facilitate addiction prevention and treatment.

== Expanding drug treatment ==
In 1987, the Centro das Taipas in Lisbon was created, an institution specialising in the treatment of drug addicts. This centre consisted of a consultation service, a day centre and a patient detoxification unit. This facility was the responsibility of the Ministry of Health, and was the first in the network of centres specialising in treating drug addiction which now covers the whole country.

Healthcare for drug users in Portugal is organised mainly through the public network services of treatment for illicit substance dependence, under the Institute on Drugs and Drug Addiction, and the Ministry of Health. In addition to public services, certification and protocols between NGOs and other public or private treatment services ensure a wide access to quality-controlled services encompassing several treatment modalities. The public services provided are free of charge and accessible to all drug users who seek treatment.

There are 73 specialised treatment facilities (public and certified private therapeutic communities), 14 detoxification units, 70 public outpatient facilities and 13 accredited day centres. Portugal is divided into 18 districts. There is full coverage of drug outpatient treatment across all but four districts (districts not covered are located in the north of the country: Viana do Castelo, Bragança, Viseu and Guarda).

=== Substitution treatment ===
Substitution treatment is today widely available in Portugal, through public services such as specialized treatment centers, health centers, hospitals and pharmacies as well as NGOs and non-profit organizations.

The Portuguese substitution program started in 1977 in Oporto. The CEPD/North (Study Centre on Drug Prevention/North), using methadone as the substituting substance, was the only unit using opioid substitution until 1992. However, the increase in numbers of drug addicts (including an "explosion" at the beginning of the 1990s), together with the growth of AIDS and hepatitis C among this population, led to a change in attitude. After 1992, methadone-substitution programs were extended to several CATs (Centres of Assistance to drug addicts). Overall, the programmes were medium or high threshold. With the exception of occasional activities in a slum area in Lisbon, there were no true low-threshold programs (risk- and harm reduction) prior to 2001.

From 2000 to 2008, the number of people in Portugal receiving substitution treatment increased from 6040 to 25 808 (24 312 in 2007), 75% of whom were in methadone maintenance treatment. The remaining patients received high dosage buprenorphine treatment.

Buprenorphine had been available since 1999, and later also the buprenorphine/naloxone combination.

Decree-Law 183/2001 Article 44.1 and Decree-Law 15/93 Article 15.1-3 stipulate that methadone treatment can be initiated by treatment centers whereas buprenorphine treatment can be initiated by any medical doctor, specialized medical doctors and treatment centers. From 2004, there was also the provision of buprenorphine in pharmacies.

=== After-care and social re-integration ===
After-care and social re-integration of drug users in Portugal is organised through three major programmes targeting different regions in Portugal (Programa Vida Emprego, Programa Quadro Reinserir and the PIDDAC incentives for re-integration). All three programmes finance different initiatives and projects supporting drug users through training opportunities, employment support, and/or housing.

=== Monitoring drug treatment ===
A national treatment monitoring system is being developed but has not yet been implemented in all regions. National routine statistics from outpatient centres on substitution clients are available (for clients in methadone and buprenorphine programmes).

== Laws and regulations ==
In July 2001, a new law maintained the status of illegality for using or possessing any drug for personal use without authorization. The offense was changed from a criminal one with prison as a possible punishment, to an administrative one if the amount possessed was no more than a ten-day supply of that substance. This was in line with the de facto Portuguese drug policy before the reform. Drug addicts were then to be aggressively targeted with therapy or community service rather than fines or waivers. Even if there are no criminal penalties, these changes did not legalize drug use in Portugal. Possession has remained prohibited by Portuguese law, and criminal penalties are still applied to drug growers, dealers and traffickers. Despite this, the law was still associated with a nearly 50% decrease in convictions and imprisonments of drug traffickers from 2001 to 2015.

=== Regulation ===
Individuals found in possession of small quantities of drugs are issued summons. The drugs are confiscated, and the suspect is interviewed by a "Commission for the Dissuasion of Drug Addiction" (Comissões para a Dissuasão da Toxicodependência – CDT). These commissions are made up of three people: A social worker, a psychiatrist, and an attorney. The dissuasion commission have powers comparable to an arbitration committee, but restricted to cases involving drug use or possession of small amounts of drugs. There is one CDT in each of Portugal's 18 districts.

The committees have a broad range of sanctions available to them when ruling on the drug use offence. These include:

- Fines, ranging from €25 to €150. These figures are based on the Portuguese minimum wage of about €485 (Banco de Portugal, 2001) and translate into hours of work lost.
- Suspension of the right to practice if the user has a licensed profession (e.g. medical doctor, taxi driver) and may endanger another person or someone's possessions.
- Ban on visiting certain places (e.g. specific clubbing venues).
- Ban on associating with specific other persons.
- Foreign travel ban.
- Requirement to report periodically to the committee.
- Withdrawal of the right to carry a gun.
- Confiscation of personal possessions.
- Cessation of subsidies or allowances that a person receives from a public agency.

If the person is addicted to drugs, they may be admitted to a drug rehabilitation facility or be given community service, if the dissuasion committee finds that this better serves the purpose of keeping the offender out of trouble. The committee cannot mandate compulsory treatment, although its orientation is to induce addicts to enter and remain in treatment. The committee has the explicit power to suspend sanctions conditional upon voluntary entry into treatment. If the offender is not addicted to drugs, or unwilling to submit to treatment or community service, he or she may be given a fine.

For example, in 2005, there were 3,192 commission hearings on drug use. 83% of commissions were suspended because the offender had no prior convictions or because the offender agreed to seek drug addiction treatment. 15% ended with some form of a sanction, which could have included a verbal warning, a fine, a loss of professional licenses, among other administrative actions. The remaining 2.5% were found not guilty or responsible. Arrest rates dropped to zero, because there were no longer any criminal penalties attached to possession.

== Observations ==
There is little reliable information about drug use, injecting behaviour or addiction treatment in Portugal before 2001, when general population surveys commenced. Until then, there were the indicators on lifetime prevalence amongst youth, collected as part of the European School Survey Project on Alcohol and Other Drugs (ESPAD), and some other (less reliable) data available through the EMCDDA.

Thorough studies on how the various efforts have been implemented were not conducted. Thus, a causal effect between strategy efforts and these developments cannot be firmly established. There are, however, statistical indicators that suggest the following correlations between the drug strategy and the following developments, starting with the establishment of the NSAFD in 1999:

- Increased uptake of treatment (roughly 60% increase as of 2012.)
- Reduction in new HIV diagnoses amongst drug users by 17% and a general drop of 90% in drug-related HIV infection.
- In April 2009, the Cato Institute published a White Paper about the "decriminalization" of drugs in Portugal, paid for by the Marijuana Policy Project. Data about the heroin usage rates of 13-16-year-olds from EMCDDA were used in the report to claim that "decriminalization" has had no adverse effect on drug usage rates and that drug-related pathologies - such as sexually transmitted diseases and deaths due to drug usage - had decreased dramatically.
- The number of newly diagnosed HIV cases among drug users was 13.4 cases per million in 2009 which is high above the European average of 2.85 cases per million, but still a significant reduction from the years prior to 2001.
- The number of drug related deaths has reduced from 131 in 2001 to 20 in 2008. As of 2012, Portugal's drug death toll sat at 3 per million, in comparison to the EU average of 17.3 per million, as one of the lowest drug-related death rates in the EU. This reduction has decreased in later years. The number of drug related deaths is now almost on the same level as before the drug strategy was implemented. However, this may be accounted for by improvement in measurement practices, which includes a doubling of toxicological autopsies now being performed, meaning that more drugs related deaths are likely to be recorded.
- Reported lifetime use of "all illicit drugs" increased from 7.8% to 12%, lifetime use of cannabis increased from 7.6% to 11.7%, cocaine use more than doubled, from 0.9% to 1.9%, ecstasy nearly doubled from 0.7% to 1.3%, and heroin increased from 0.7% to 1.1% It has been proposed that this effect may have been related to the candor of interviewees, who may have been inclined to answer more truthfully due to a reduction in the stigma associated with drug use. However, during the same period, the use of heroin and cannabis also increased in Spain and Italy, where drugs for personal use were decriminalised many years earlier than in Portugal while the use of Cannabis and heroin decreased in the rest of Western Europe. The increase in drug use observed among adults in Portugal was not greater than that seen in nearby countries that did not change their drug laws.
- Drug use among adolescents (13–15 years) and "problematic" users declined.
- Drug-related criminal justice workloads decreased.
- Decreased street value of most illicit drugs, some significantly.
- It is estimated that the social cost of drug use decreased by 12% on average in the 5-year period following the establishment of NSAFD in 1999, and an 18% on average reduction since 2010. The social cost of drug use is defined by the sum of public expenditure on drugs, the private costs incurred by individual drug users, and costs taken on by society, including loss of income and loss of productivity.

== Table and chart comparing countries ==
One is for rates and one is for counts.

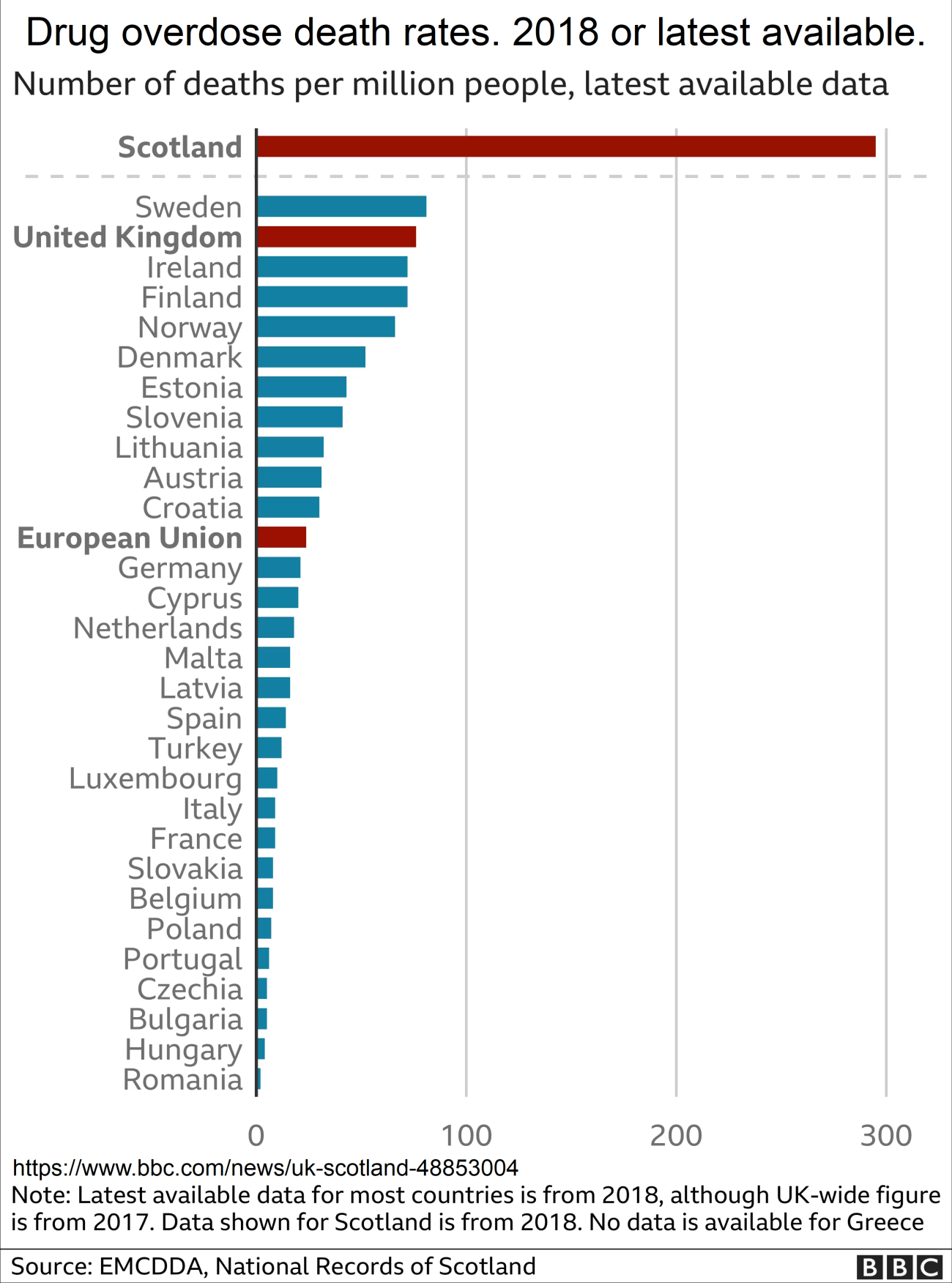
Drug overdose death rates for European countries.

- Row numbers below are static. Other columns are sortable. This allows ranking of any column.
- Location links below are "Healthcare in LOCATION" links.

Drug overdose deaths per year.
Location	2021	2020	2019	2018	2017
Austria	235	191	196	184	154
Belgium			168	152	148
Bulgaria	20	24	11	24	18
Croatia	77	99	97	85	65
Cyprus	10	6	5	12	16
Czech Republic	64	58	42	39	42
Denmark		197	202	183	239
Estonia	39	33	27	39	110
Finland	287	258	234	261	200
France					417
Germany	1,826	1,581	1,398	1,276	1,272
Greece			230	274	255
Hungary	42	48	43	33	33
Ireland					235
Italy	293	309	374	336	297
Latvia	17	21	12	20	22
Lithuania	62	47	52	59	83
Luxembourg	5	6	8	4	8
Malta	5			3	5
Netherlands	298	295	252	224	262
Norway	241	324	275	286	247
Poland		229	212	199	202
Portugal		63	72	55	51
Romania	30	33	45	26	32
Slovakia	28	37	34	32	19
Slovenia	65	70	74	59	47
Spain		774	546	450	437
Sweden	450	524	555	583	643
Turkey		314	342	657	941
United Kingdom					3,284

== Legal status of cannabis in Portugal ==
=== Consumption and possession ===
In Portugal, recreational use of cannabis is forbidden by law. In July 2018, legislation was signed into law to allow for the medical use of cannabis in Portugal and its dispensation at pharmacies. Portugal signed all the UN conventions on narcotics and psychotropic to date. With the 2001 decriminalization bill, the consumer is now regarded as a patient and not as a criminal (having the amount usually used for ten days of personal use is not a punishable crime). According to the libertarian think tank Cato Institute, illegal drug use among Portuguese teenagers declined after 2001, and 45 percent of the country's heroin addicts sought medical treatment. Cannabis use in Portugal is 9.7% lower than the average European use of 15.1%. While the prevalence of cannabis use at any point in an individual's life is less in Portugal, lifetime cannabis use has been rising since 2012. In addition, Portugal has a 2-3 times higher prevalence of moderate/heavy cannabis users than other European Countries. Hospitalizations with a diagnosis of a psychotic disorder or schizophrenia associated with cannabis use have increased 29.4 times from 2000 to 2015.

=== Cultivation and distribution ===
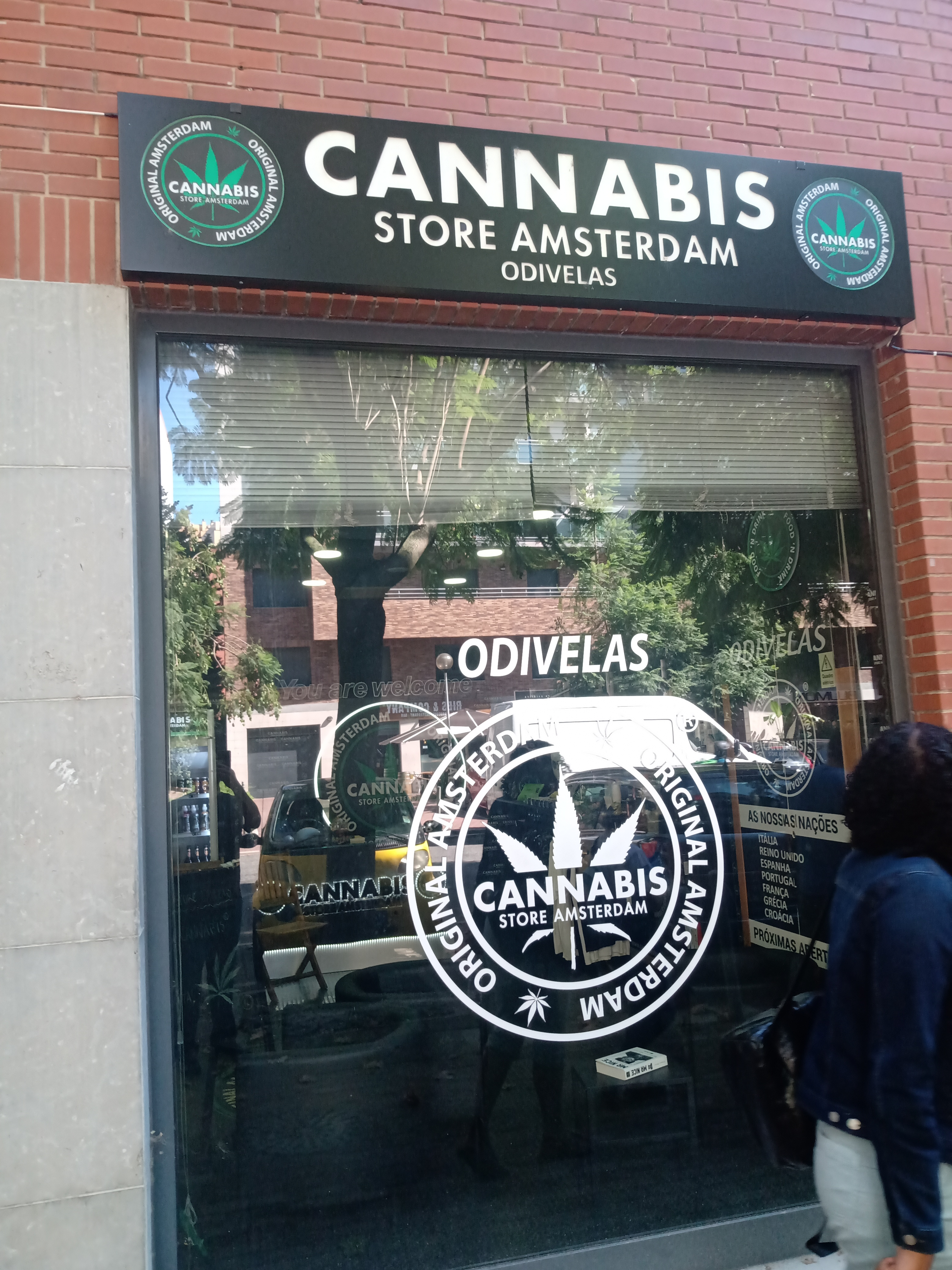
Cannabis Store Amsterdam in Odivelas, Lisbon Metropolitan Area: Cannabis cultivation by ordinary people is illegal in Portugal even when performed for small-scale self-consumption at home. By the early 2020s, cannabis shops became popular in the country but were only allowed to sell cannabis products without THC.

The cultivation of cannabis, even on a very small-scale home grown basis for personal use only, can legally be prosecuted. However, an unknown number of enthusiasts of small-scale home-cultivation grow the plants with a high degree of secrecy due to the legal punishment they could face if prosecuted, and due to potential social stigma as well. In neighboring Spain, small-scale cultivation of cannabis plants for personal use only, is tolerated by the authorities and there are many grow shops across the country selling their products physically and online. In 2003 another update to the "Portuguese drugs law" brought the criminalization of the possession of cannabis seeds, except certified industrial hemp seed. This law made the buying of cannabis seeds from legal and financially transparent online cannabis seed shops based in other European Union member states, such as neighboring Spain or the Netherlands, an unlawful transaction when performed by Portuguese residents. The provision of seeds and tools to produce and consume cannabis is also illegal in the country. Production and distribution of hemp products is legal but regulated. There are a small number of hemp shops in Portugal and hemp products are legal.

== See also ==
- Drug liberalization
- Drug policy of the Netherlands
