= List of countries by total health expenditure by type of financing =

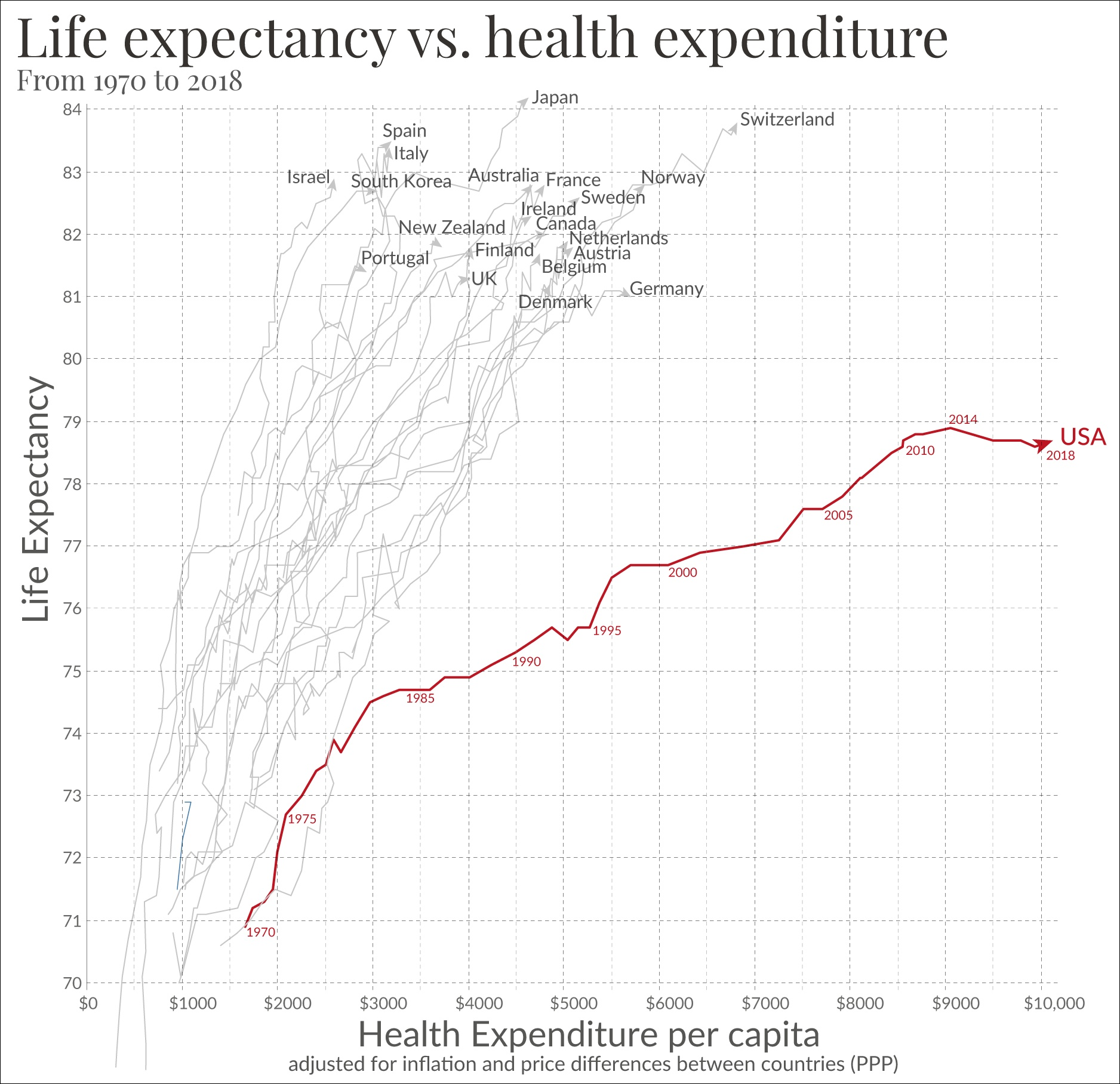
Life expectancy vs healthcare spending of rich OECD countries. US average of $10,447 in 2018.

This is a list of OECD nations, and a few other nations tracked by the OECD iLibrary, and their health expenditure by type of financing.

Public health expenditure consists of recurrent and capital spending from government (central and local) budgets, external borrowings and grants (including donations from international agencies and nongovernmental organizations), and social (or compulsory) health insurance funds. Total health expenditure is the sum of public and private health expenditure. It covers the provision of health services (preventive and curative), family planning activities, nutrition activities, and emergency aid designated for health but does not include provision of water and sanitation.

== List ==
Table is initially in descending order by the percentage of health expenditure paid by the government. OECD36 average is for the 36 OECD nations at the time this data was compiled at the source.

Superscript numbers next to country names:

- 1. All spending by private health insurance companies in the United States is reported under compulsory health insurance.
- 2. Health payment schemes unable to be disaggregated into voluntary health insurance, NPISH and enterprise financing are reported under other.
- 3. Voluntary payment schemes unable to be disaggregated are reported under voluntary health insurance.

Location links below are "Healthcare in LOCATION" links.

Health expenditure by type of financing, 2017 (or nearest year). Percentages.
Location	Government schemes	Out of pocket	Voluntary health insurance	Compulsory health insurance	Other type of financing
Norway	85	14			
Denmark	84	14	2		
Sweden	84	15	1		1
Iceland	82	16			2
United Kingdom	79	16	3		2
Italy	74	23	2		1
Ireland	73	12	13		2
New Zealand	69	14	5	9	3
Australia	69	18	10		3
Canada	68	15	13	1	2
Spain	66	24	5	4	
Portugal	65	28	5	1	1
Finland	62	20	2	14	3
Latvia	57	42	1		
Brazil	43	27	28		2
South Africa³	43	8	49		1
OECD36 average	36	21	4	37	2
Austria	30	19	5	44	2
Greece	27	35	4	33	
Indonesia²	27	37	1	18	16
United States¹	26	11		58	4
Mexico	24	41	6	28	2
Turkey²	22	17		56	5
Switzerland	22	29	7	42	1
India²	22	65	2	3	8
Belgium	21	18	5	56	
Russia	21	40	2	36	
China²	19	36		39	6
Israel	16	22	11	48	3
Czech Republic	13	15		69	3
Poland	10	23	6	59	2
Estonia	10	24		64	1
South Korea	10	34	7	49	1
Lithuania	9	32	1	58	
Japan	9	13	2	75	1
Hungary	8	27	2	61	2
Costa Rica	7	22	3	68	
Germany	6	13	1	78	2
Netherlands	6	11	6	75	1
Colombia	6	16	10	68	
France	5	9	7	78	1
Luxembourg	5	11	3	79	2
Slovenia	3	12	14	69	1
Slovakia	2	19		78	1
Chile	2	34	6	58	

== See also ==
- Health spending as percent of gross domestic product (GDP) by country
- List of countries by hospital beds
- List of countries by life expectancy
- List of countries by total health expenditure per capita
