= List of countries by hospital beds =

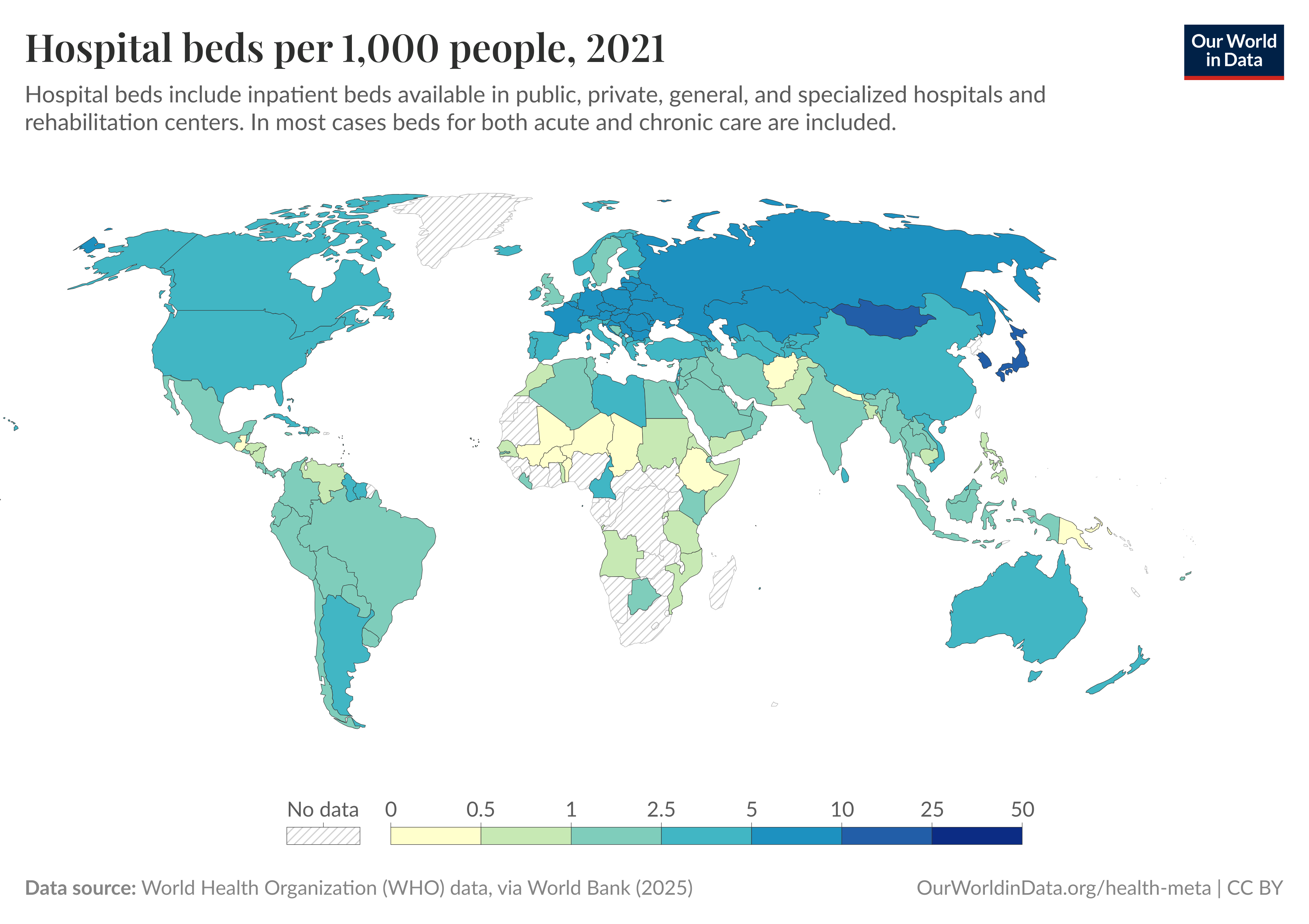
Hospital beds per 1000 people in 2013

The number of beds per people is an important indicator of the health care system of a country. The basic measure focus on all hospital beds, which are variously split and occupied. The classic hospital beds are also called curative beds. For severe patients with risk of organ(s) failure, patients are provided intensive care unit beds (a.k.a. ICU bed) or critical care beds (CCB).

Among OECD countries, curative beds' occupancy rate average was 75%, from 94.9% (Ireland) to 61.6% (Greece), with half of the OECD's nation between 70% and 80%.

In 2009, European nations, most of those that are also part of OECD, had an aggregated total of nearly 2.1 million acute beds and 73,585 critical care beds (CCB) or 11.5CCB/100,000 inhabitants. Germany had 29.2, Portugal 4.2. Aging population leads to increased demand for CCB and difficulties to satisfy it, while both quantity of CCB and availability are poorly documented.

Base capacity for lower-income countries is approximately 0.1 ICU beds per 100,000 citizens.

== Data ==
Hospital beds by country
Country (or territory)	Region	Hospital beds per 1,000 people										Occu- pancy (%)	ICU-CCB beds /100,000 inhabitants	Ventilators
Country (or territory)	Region	2013	2014	2015	2016	2017	2018	2019	2020	2021	2022	Occu- pancy (%)	ICU-CCB beds /100,000 inhabitants	Ventilators
North Korea	Asia	13.20	13.2	13.2	13.2	13.2	13.2	13.2	13.2	13.2	13.2			
Belarus	Europe	10.2	10.1	10	9.8	9.8	9.7	9.7					866.42	
South Korea	Asia	10.92	11.59	11.61	11.99	12.29	12.44	12.43	12.65	12.77	—N/a	—N/a	10.60	9,795
Japan	Asia	13.30	13.21	13.17	13.11	13.05	12.98	12.84	12.63	12.62	12.4	75.50	13.50	45,293
Ukraine	Europe	—N/a	—N/a	—N/a	—N/a	8.80	—N/a	—N/a	—N/a	—N/a	—N/a	—N/a	—N/a	3,600
Russia	Europe	9.07	8.81	8.35	8.16	8.05	7.99	8.00	—N/a	—N/a	—N/a	—N/a	8.30	40,000 (27.3 per 100,000 inhabitants)
Bulgaria	Europe	6.82	7.13	7.24	7.27	7.45	7.57	7.74	7.82	7.92	—N/a	—N/a	—N/a	—N/a
Germany	Europe	8.28	8.23	8.13	8.06	8.00	7.98	7.91	7.82	7.76	—N/a	62.10	38.70	25,000
Romania	Europe	6.67	6.71	6.79	6.84	6.89	6.97	7.06	7.12	7.21	—N/a	—N/a	—N/a	—N/a
Austria	Europe	7.64	7.58	7.54	7.42	7.37	7.27	7.19	7.05	6.91	—N/a	73.80	21.80	2,500
Hungary	Europe	7.04	6.98	6.99	7.00	7.02	6.95	6.91	6.76	6.79	—N/a	65.50	13.80	2,560
Czech Republic	Europe	6.75	6.72	6.71	6.71	6.67	6.66	6.63	6.54	6.66	—N/a	70.10	11.60	3,529
Poland	Europe	6.61	6.63	6.63	6.64	6.62	6.54	6.17	6.19	6.27	—N/a	—N/a	6.90	10,100 (26.6 per 100,000 inhabitants)
Lithuania	Europe	7.31	7.26	6.97	6.69	6.56	6.43	6.35	6.01	6.05	—N/a	73.20	15.50	~1,000
Croatia	Europe	5.86	5.91	5.56	5.49	5.54	5.61	5.66	5.66	5.68	—N/a	—N/a	—N/a	—N/a
Slovakia	Europe	5.80	5.79	5.75	5.78	5.82	5.70	5.76	5.68	5.67	—N/a	67.80	9.20	600
France	Europe	6.28	6.19	6.13	6.05	5.97	5.89	5.81	5.72	5.65	—N/a	75.60	11.60	9,236 (2006); 7,007 (2009)
Belgium	Europe	5.93	5.85	5.83	5.76	5.66	5.62	5.57	5.53	5.49	5.47	81.80	15.90	—N/a
Hong Kong	Asia	5.40	5.40	5.40	—N/a	5.40	—N/a	—N/a	—N/a	—N/a	—N/a	—N/a	7.10	—N/a
China	Asia	3.33	3.58	3.82	4.06	4.34	4.60	4.83	5.00	5.20	8.37	—N/a	12.8	145,000 (Invasive Ventilators); 98,000 (Non-Invasive Ventilators)
Latvia	Europe	5.80	5.66	5.69	5.72	5.57	5.49	5.42	5.29	5.16	—N/a	71.10	9.70	—N/a
Argentina	Americas	—N/a	—N/a	—N/a	—N/a	5.00	—N/a	—N/a	—N/a	—N/a	—N/a	—N/a	—N/a	—N/a
Switzerland	Europe	4.85	4.73	4.73	4.69	4.65	4.63	4.59	4.48	4.43	—N/a	82.00	11.00	—N/a
Estonia	Europe	4.90	4.90	4.82	4.69	4.61	4.53	4.53	4.46	4.39	—N/a	70.40	14.60	—N/a
Greece	Europe	4.24	4.24	4.25	4.20	4.21	4.20	4.18	4.23	4.27	—N/a	61.60	11.2	—N/a
Slovenia	Europe	4.55	4.54	4.51	4.49	4.50	4.43	4.43	4.28	4.25	—N/a	69.50	6.40	—N/a
Luxembourg	Europe	5.17	5.05	4.96	4.82	4.66	4.51	4.26	4.19	4.14	—N/a	70.70	24.80	—N/a
Australia	Oceania	3.74	3.79	3.82	3.84	—N/a	—N/a	—N/a	—N/a	—N/a	—N/a	—N/a	9.10	1,314
Portugal	Europe	3.39	3.32	3.37	3.39	3.39	3.44	3.51	3.50	3.50	—N/a	66.80	4.20	1,400
Norway	Europe	3.86	3.84	3.76	3.68	3.60	3.53	3.47	3.40	3.40	—N/a	80.70	8.00	800
Italy	Europe	3.31	3.21	3.20	3.17	3.18	3.14	3.16	3.19	3.12	—N/a	78.90	12.50	5,324 (January 2020); 5,000 (8.3 per 100,000 inhabitants)
Turkey	Asia	2.65	2.68	2.68	2.75	2.81	2.85	2.88	3.01	3.02	—N/a	68.00	46.50	17,000
United States	Americas	2.89	2.83	2.80	2.77	2.86	2.83	2.80	2.78	2.77	3.00	64.00	29.40	177,000; 68,000 (18.8 per 100,000 inhabitants)
Israel	Asia	3.09	3.08	3.03	2.99	3.01	2.97	2.97	2.92	2.91	2.99	93.30	—N/a	—N/a
Spain	Europe	2.96	2.97	2.98	2.97	2.97	2.97	2.95	2.96	2.96	—N/a	75.30	9.70	—N/a
Netherlands	Europe	3.69	3.55	3.49	3.41	3.28	3.18	3.02	2.91	2.95	—N/a	55.40	8.40	—N/a
Ireland	Europe	2.56	2.57	2.92	2.95	2.97	2.97	2.88	2.89	2.89	—N/a	94.90	6.50	—N/a
Iceland	Europe	3.22	3.16	3.12	3.13	3.06	2.87	2.80	2.84	—N/a	—N/a	—N/a	9.10	—N/a
Finland	Europe	4.86	4.53	4.28	3.97	3.75	3.61	3.35	2.75	2.76	—N/a	—N/a	6.10	—N/a
Canada	Americas	2.72	2.67	2.62	2.60	2.53	2.55	2.52	2.55	2.60	—N/a	91.60	13.50	—N/a
New Zealand	Oceania	2.78	2.75	2.71	2.72	2.70	2.59	2.54	2.49	2.67	2.57	—N/a	4.60	334
Denmark	Europe	3.07	—N/a	—N/a	2.60	2.61	2.61	2.59	2.59	2.51	—N/a	—N/a	6.70	—N/a
Brazil	Americas	2.47	2.46	2.37	2.34	2.32	2.28	2.26	2.45	2.47	—N/a	—N/a	—N/a	—N/a
United Kingdom	Europe	2.76	2.73	2.61	2.57	2.54	2.50	2.45	2.43	2.42	2.44	84.30	6.60	5,000; 8,175 (10.1 per 100,000 inhabitants)
Sweden	Europe	2.59	2.54	2.44	2.34	2.21	2.13	2.07	2.05	2.00	—N/a	—N/a	5.80	570
Chile	Americas	2.17	2.12	2.14	2.12	2.11	2.06	2.03	2.01	1.95	1.93	79.10	—N/a	—N/a
Colombia	Americas	1.55	1.59	1.61	1.68	1.70	1.71	1.74	1.69	—N/a	—N/a	—N/a	—N/a	—N/a
Costa Rica	Americas	1.18	1.17	1.16	1.15	1.14	1.11	1.10	1.15	1.17	1.11	—N/a	—N/a	—N/a
Indonesia	Asia	0.97	0.93	0.98	0.99	1.04	—N/a	—N/a	—N/a	—N/a	—N/a	—N/a	—N/a	—N/a
Mexico	Americas	1.02	1.01	0.99	0.99	0.98	0.97	0.95	0.99	1.00	—N/a	—N/a	—N/a	—N/a
India	Asia	0.49	0.52	0.57	0.47	0.52	—N/a	—N/a	—N/a	—N/a	—N/a	—N/a	—N/a	—N/a

== COVID-19 pandemic ==
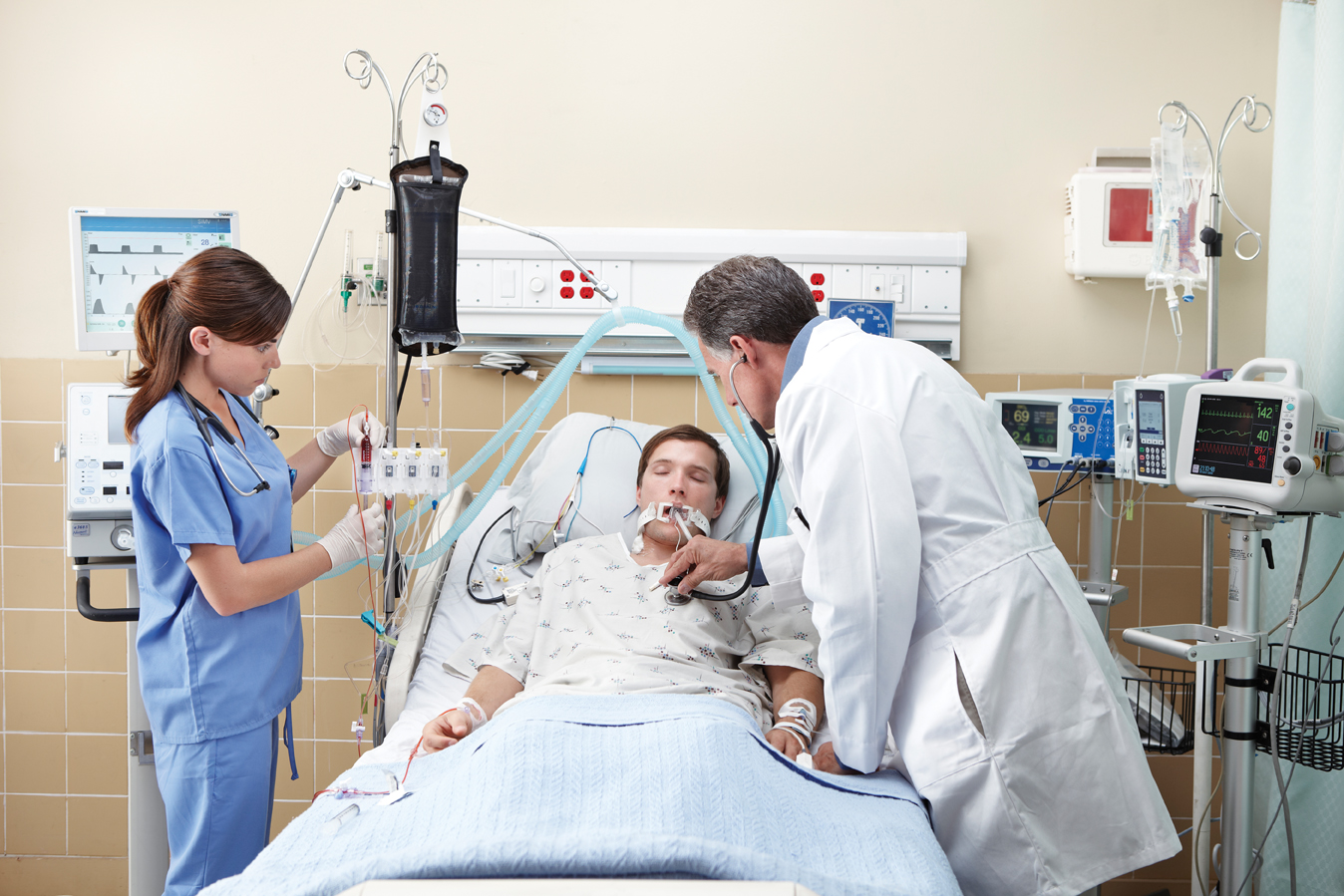
A patient and clinicians in an intensive care unit

The availability of CCB-ICU beds, mechanical ventilation and ECMO devices generally closely associated with hospital beds has been described as a critical bottleneck in responding to the COVID-19 pandemic. The lack of such devices dramatically raises the mortality rate of COVID-19.

In early March, the UK government supported a strategy to develop natural herd immunity, drawing sharp criticism from medical personnel and researchers. Various forecasts by Imperial College COVID-19 Response Team, made public on March 16, suggested that the peak number of cases in the UK would require between 100 and 225 CCBs / 100,000 inhabitants, if proper mitigation or no mitigation strategies are put into force, respectively. These requirements would both exceed the UK's current capacities of 6.6–14 CCB / 100,000 inhabitants. In the best case scenario, the peak caseload would require 7.5 times the current number of available ICU beds. Around March 16, the UK government changed trajectory toward a more standard mitigation/suppression strategy.

In France, around March 15, the Grand Est region was the first to express the scarcity of CCB limiting its handling of the crisis. Assistance-publique Hôpitaux de Paris (AP-HP), which manages most hospitals in the French capital area (~10 million inhabitants), reported the need for 19 400 ICUs. Current capacity is reported to be between 1500 and 350, depending on the source.

In Europe, the company Löwenstein Medical producing 1500 ICU-level ventilators and 20,000 home-level ventilator per year for France alone, pointed out of the current high demand and production shortage. Based in Germany, all their components are European and not relying on Chinese supply chains. As for production ramp up, the company has increased the production of mobile ventilators, that are more basic and can be assembled in half an hour, yet able to support patients with acute respiratory distress syndrome. Due to the coronavirus pandemic, in March 2020 the German government ordered 16.500 units for ventilation and intubation from two German companies. According to the company spokesman, a second bottleneck is the number of available medical staff, trained for such medical devices.

== See also ==
- Hospital bed
- Mechanical ventilation
- List of largest hospital campuses (by beds and staff size)
- List of countries by life expectancy
