= Health in Uzbekistan =

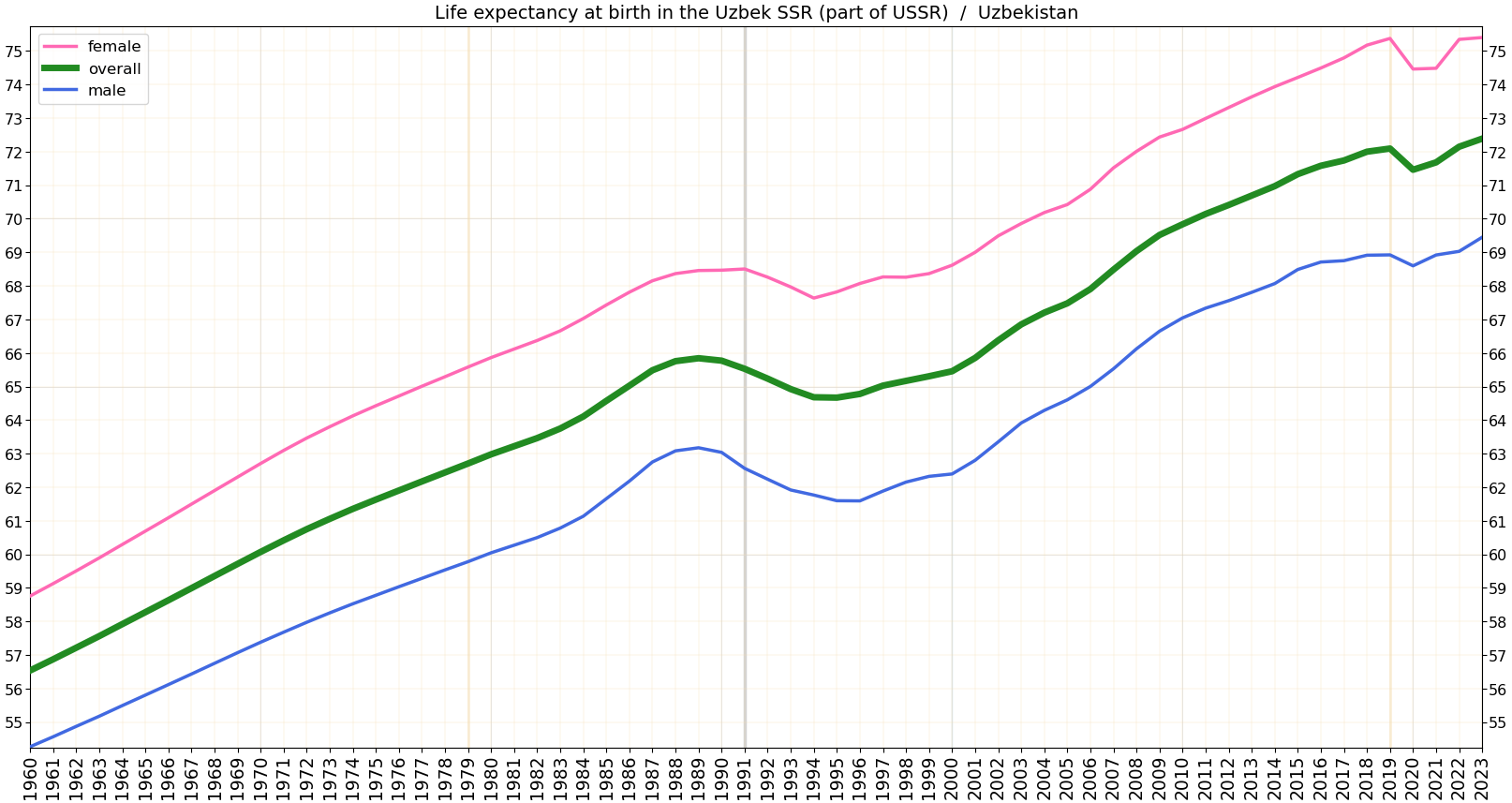
Life expectancy at birth in Uzbekistan

In the post-Soviet era, the quality of Uzbekistan’s health care has declined. Between 1992 and 2003, spending on health care and the ratio of hospital beds to population both decreased by nearly 50 percent, and Russian emigration in that decade deprived the health system of many practitioners. In 2004 Uzbekistan had 53 hospital beds per 10,000 population. Basic medical supplies such as disposable needles, anesthetics, and antibiotics are in very short supply. Although all citizens nominally are entitled to free health care, in the post-Soviet era bribery has become a common way to bypass the slow and limited service of the state system. In the early 2000s, policy has focused on improving primary health care facilities and cutting the cost of inpatient facilities. The state budget for 2006 allotted 11.1 percent to health expenditures, compared with 10.9 percent in 2005.

== Health status ==
Among the most common diseases are those associated with polluted drinking water: typhoid, hepatitis, dysentery, cholera, and various types of cancer. The chief causes of death are, in order of frequency, disorders of the cardiovascular, respiratory, and digestive systems and infectious and parasitic diseases. A study published in the Lancet in 2019 found that there were 892 diet-related deaths per 100,000 people a year, the highest number in the world.

The reported incidence of human immunodeficiency virus (HIV) has increased sharply beginning in 2002, partly because of a new government reporting policy and partly because of increased drug abuse In 2005 about 5,600 cases of HIV were known, after 2,000 new cases appeared in 2004. At least two-thirds of cases have been linked with drug abuse. The geographic centers of the HIV cases are Tashkent and Surxondaryo Region on the Afghanistan border. Expanding drug trafficking through Uzbekistan has led to increased drug addiction in urban areas. Some HIV treatment and counseling centers exist. There are 27.4 doctors per 10,000 inhabitants or 2.74 per 1,000 people.

=== Maternal and child health ===
The 2010 maternal mortality rate per 100,000 births for Uzbekistan is 30. This is compared with 44.6 in 2008 and 61.1 in 1990. The under 5 mortality rate, per 1,000 births is 38 and the neonatal mortality as a percentage of under 5's mortality is 48. In Uzbekistan the number of midwives per 1,000 live births is unavailable and the lifetime risk of death for pregnant women is 1 in 1400.

== Healthcare facilities ==
There are 16 mental hospitals in Uzbekistan. There are 2,834 primary and rural medical facilities in Uzbekistan. Some of the notable hospitals include:

- Bukhara Himchan Hospital, opened in 2019
- COVID-19 Hospital in Tashkent, 2,000 beds, built in 2019 in Tashkent
- Central Military Medical Hospital, in Tashkent
- Horev Medical Center in Tashkent
- MDS Service is a private hospital in Tashkent
- National Children's Medical Center in Tashkent
- Republican Science Centre of Emergency Medical Service (ex. hospital #16)
- Samarkand Central City Hospital in Samarkand
- Tashkent International Clinic in Tashkent
- Tashkent City Hospital of Emergency Health Care

== See also ==
- Uzbekistan
