= Health in the Marshall Islands =

Life expectancy of the people of Marshall Islands in 2017 was 67 years for men and 71 years for women. Infant mortality has been reduced from 40 to 22 per 1000 live births between 1990 and 2010.

== Diabetes ==
Prevalence of obesity in the adult population, top countries (2016), the Marshall Islands have the third highest rate in the world.

A 2007–2008 study revealed that the rate of type 2 diabetes is among the highest in the world; 28% over the age of 15; 50% over 35. Approximately 75% of women, and 50% of men are overweight or obese. This is mostly due to the adoption of an unhealthy diet and lack of exercise. About 50% of all surgeries performed on the island are amputations due to complications from diabetes. There are no facilities for renal dialysis.

== Healthcare ==
The Health Services Board is responsible for public health services. There are two public hospitals, Leroj Atama Medical Center in Majuro which has 101 beds and Leroj Kitlang Health Center in Ebeye which has 45. There are 58 health care centres on the outer atolls and islands. There is also a hospital on Kwajalein Atoll at the US military base which serves only the American forces.

Blood transfusion is organised informally, as there is no blood bank.
