= Universal health care =

Type of health care system

The universal health coverage uhc service coverage index

A universal health care or universal health coverage (UHC) system is a healthcare system in which all citizens of a country have some level of health coverage.

While often confused with single-payer healthcare (in which the government provides health coverage for all citizens), universal health coverage can be achieved through many different models, and only 13 of the OECD's 34 countries used single-payer models as of 2013. Countries may achieve coverage through the Beveridge model (as in the United Kingdom), in which the government provides healthcare directly; through a single public insurer contracting with private healthcare providers (as in Canada); through mandatory social insurance provided by non-governmental organizations (as in Germany); or through mandatory private insurance provided by for-profit companies (as in the Netherlands and Switzerland). Systems also differ substantially in which services are covered and what share of costs patients pay.

The World Health Organization describes universal healthcare as a situation where citizens can access health services without incurring financial hardship, and Sustainable Development Goal 3 includes universal health coverage.

== History ==
Universal health care start date
| Country | Year |
|---|---|
| Algeria | 1975 |
| Armenia | 2023 |
| Australia | 1975 |
| Austria | 1967 |
| Bahrain | 1957 |
| Belgium | 1945 |
| Bhutan | 1970 |
| Brazil | 1988 |
| Brunei | 1958 |
| Canada | 1966 |
| China | 2009 |
| Cyprus | 1980 |
| Denmark | 1973 |
| Finland | 1972 |
| France | 1974 |
| Germany | 1941 |
| Greece | 1983 |
| Hong Kong | 1993 |
| Iceland | 1990 |
| Indonesia | 2014 |
| Ireland | 1977 |
| Israel | 1995 |
| Italy | 1978 |
| Japan | 1961 |
| Kuwait | 1950 |
| Luxembourg | 1973 |
| Malaysia | 1980s |
| Netherlands | 1966 |
| New Zealand | 1938 |
| Norway | 1956 |
| Portugal | 1979 |
| Russia | 1918 |
| Saudi Arabia | 2019 |
| Singapore | 1993 |
| Slovenia | 1972 |
| South Korea | 1988 |
| Spain | 1986 |
| Sweden | 1955 |
| Switzerland | 1994 |
| Taiwan | 1995 |
| Thailand | 2001 |
| Turkey | 2003 |
| United Arab Emirates | 1971 |
| United Kingdom | 1948 |

The first move towards a national health insurance system was launched in Germany in 1883, with the Sickness Insurance Law. Industrial employers were mandated to provide injury and illness insurance for their low-wage workers, and the system was funded and administered by employees and employers through "sick funds", which were drawn from deductions in workers' wages and from employers' contributions. This social health insurance model, named the Bismarck Model after Prussian Chancellor Otto von Bismarck, was the first form of universal care in modern times.

Other countries soon began to follow suit. In the United Kingdom, the National Insurance Act 1911 provided coverage for primary care (but not specialist or hospital care) for wage earners, covering about one-third of the population. The Russian Empire established a similar system in 1912, and other industrialized countries began following suit. By the 1930s, similar systems existed in virtually all of Western and Central Europe. Japan introduced an employee health insurance law in 1927, expanding further upon it in 1935 and 1940.

Following the Russian Revolution of 1917, the Bolsheviks established the world's first fully free and universal health care system in Soviet Russia in July 1918. The system was highly centralized, and while nominally any person regardless of his status was covered, the actual coverage, especially in the more remote and impoverished areas was virtually non-existent.

In New Zealand, a universal health care system was created in a series of steps, from 1938 to 1941. In Australia, the state of Queensland introduced a free public hospital system in 1946.

Following World War II, universal health care systems began to be set up around the world. On July 5, 1948, the United Kingdom launched its universal National Health Service. Universal health care was next introduced in the Nordic countries of Sweden (1955), Iceland (1956), Norway (1956), Denmark (1961) and Finland (1964). Universal health insurance was introduced in Japan in 1961, and in Canada through stages, starting with the province of Saskatchewan in 1962, followed by the rest of Canada from 1968 to 1972. A public healthcare system was introduced in Egypt following the Egyptian revolution of 1952. Centralized public healthcare systems were set up in the Eastern bloc countries. The Soviet Union extended universal health care to its rural residents in 1969. Kuwait and Bahrain introduced their universal healthcare systems in 1950 and 1957 respectively (prior to independence). Italy introduced its Servizio Sanitario Nazionale (National Health Service) in 1978. Universal health insurance was implemented in Australia in 1975 with the Medibank, which led to universal coverage under the current Medicare system from 1984.

From the 1970s to the 2000s, Western European countries began introducing universal coverage, most of them building upon previous health insurance programs to cover the whole population. For example, France built upon its 1928 national health insurance system, with subsequent legislation covering a larger and larger percentage of the population, until the remaining 1% of the population that was uninsured received coverage in 2000. Single payer healthcare systems were introduced in Finland (1972), Portugal (1979), Cyprus (1980), Spain (1986) and Iceland (1990). Switzerland introduced a universal healthcare system based on an insurance mandate in 1994. In addition, universal health coverage was introduced in some Asian countries, including Malaysia (1980s), South Korea (1989), Taiwan (1995), Singapore (1993), Israel (1995) and Thailand (2001).

Following the collapse of the Soviet Union, Russia retained and reformed its universal health care system, as did other now-independent former Soviet republics and Eastern bloc countries.

Beyond the 1990s, many countries in Latin America, the Caribbean, Africa and the Asia-Pacific region, including developing countries, took steps to bring their populations under universal health coverage, including China and Brazil's SUS which improved coverage up to 80% of the population. Taiwan implemented its system in 1995. India introduced a tax-payer funded decentralised universal healthcare system as well as comprehensive public and private health insurances that helped reduce mortality rates drastically and improved healthcare infrastructure across the country dramatically. A 2012 study examined progress being made by these countries, focusing on nine in particular: Ghana, Rwanda, Nigeria, Mali, Kenya, Indonesia, the Philippines and Vietnam.

Currently, most industrialized countries and many developing countries operate some form of publicly funded health care with universal coverage as the goal. According to the National Academy of Medicine and others, the United States is the only wealthy, industrialized nation that does not provide universal health care. The only forms of government-provided healthcare available are Medicare (for elderly patients above age 65 as well as people with disabilities), Medicaid (for low-income people), the Children's Health Insurance Program (for children in families of modest income, but too high to qualify for Medicaid), the Military Health System (active, reserve, and retired military personnel and dependants), and the Indian Health Service (members of federally recognized Native American tribes).

== Funding models ==
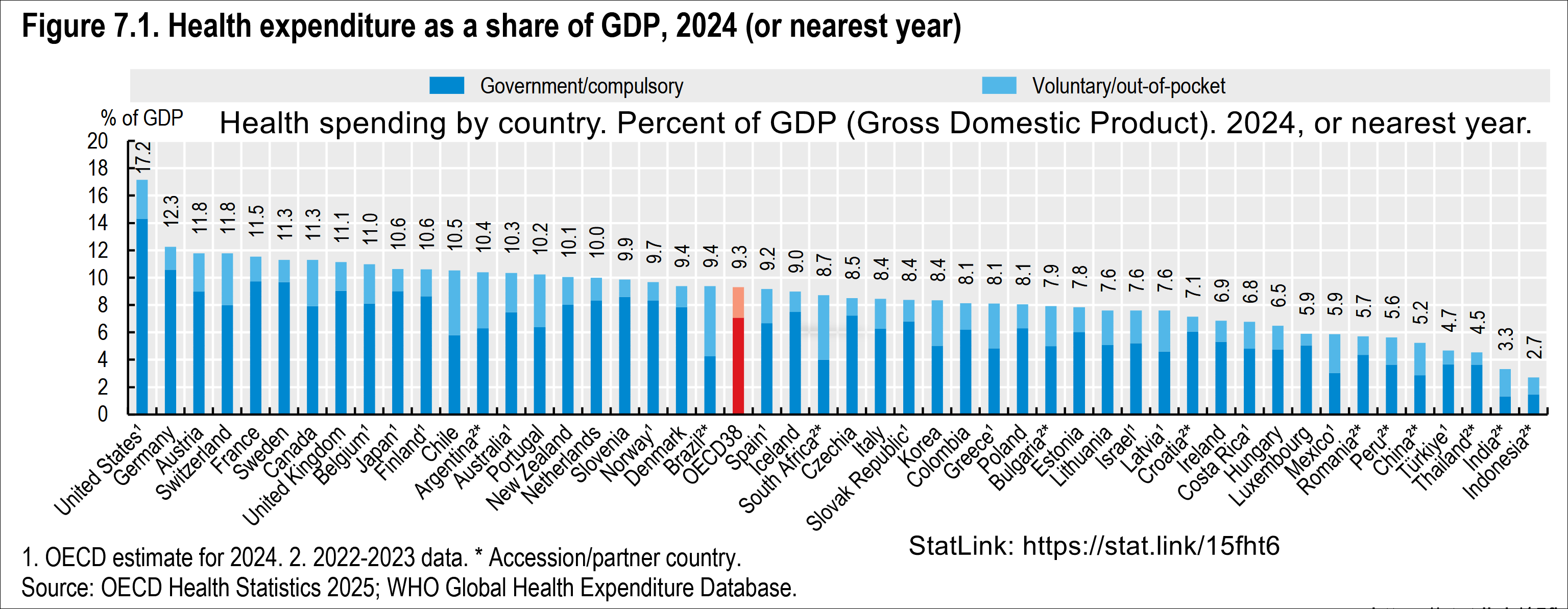
Health spending by country. Percent of GDP (Gross domestic product). For example: 11.2% for Canada in 2022. 16.6% for the United States in 2022.

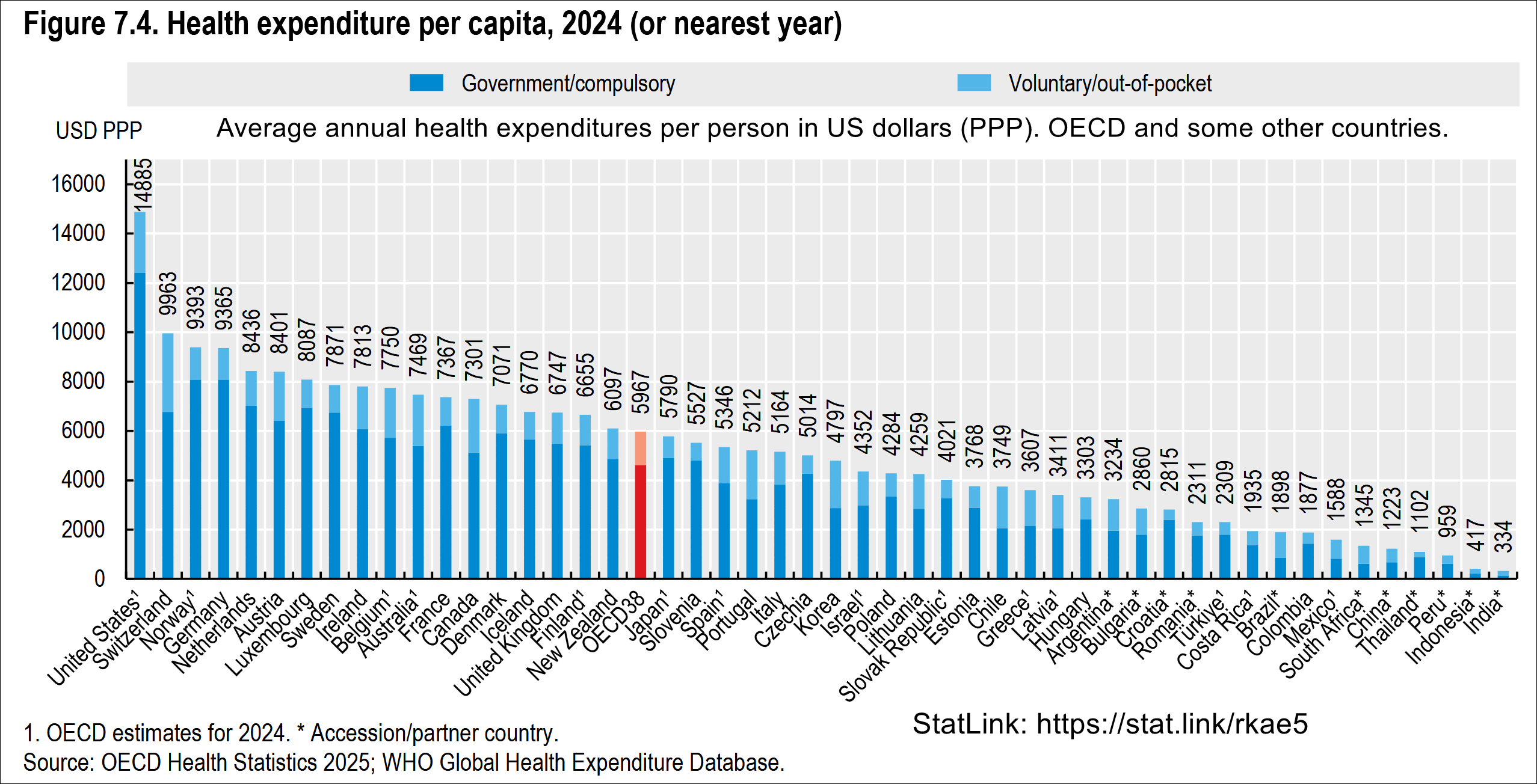
Total healthcare cost per person. Public and private spending. US dollars PPP. For example: $6,319 for Canada in 2022. $12,555 for the US in 2022.

Universal health care in most countries has been achieved by a mixed model of funding. General taxation revenue is the primary source of funding, but in many countries it is supplemented by specific charge (which may be charged to the individual or an employer) or with the option of private payments (by direct or optional insurance) for services beyond those covered by the public system. Almost all European systems are financed through a mix of public and private contributions. Most universal health care systems are funded primarily by tax revenue (as in Portugal, India, Spain, Denmark and Sweden). Some nations, such as Germany, France, and Japan, employ a multi-payer system in which health care is funded by private and public contributions. However, much of the non-government funding comes from contributions from employers and employees to regulated non-profit sickness funds. Contributions are compulsory and defined according to law. A distinction is also made between municipal and national healthcare funding. For example, one model is that the bulk of the healthcare is funded by the municipality, specialty healthcare is provided and possibly funded by a larger entity, such as a municipal co-operation board or the state, and medications are paid for by a state agency. Universal health care financing can range from premiums to taxes and fees which increase with income. Universal health care systems can have redistributive effects.

=== Compulsory insurance ===
This is usually enforced via legislation requiring residents to purchase insurance, but sometimes the government provides the insurance. Sometimes there may be a choice of multiple public and private funds providing a standard service (as in Germany) or sometimes just a single public fund. Healthcare in Switzerland is based on compulsory insurance.

In some European countries where private insurance and universal health care coexist, such as Germany, Belgium and the Netherlands, the problem of adverse selection is overcome by using a risk compensation pool to equalize, as far as possible, the risks between funds. Thus, a fund with a predominantly healthy, younger population has to pay into a compensation pool and a fund with an older and predominantly less healthy population would receive funds from the pool. In this way, sickness funds compete on price and there is no advantage in eliminating people with higher risks because they are compensated for by means of risk-adjusted capitation payments. Funds are not allowed to pick and choose their policyholders or deny coverage, but they compete mainly on price and service. In some countries, the basic coverage level is set by the government and cannot be modified.

The Republic of Ireland at one time had a "community rating" system by VHI, effectively a single-payer or common risk pool. The government later opened VHI to competition, but without a compensation pool. That resulted in foreign insurance companies entering the Irish market and offering much less expensive health insurance to relatively healthy segments of the market, which then made higher profits at VHI's expense. The government later reintroduced community rating by a pooling arrangement and at least one main major insurance company, Bupa, withdrew from the Irish market.

In Poland, people are obliged to pay a percentage of the average monthly wage to the state, even if they are covered by private insurance. People working under a employment contract pay a percentage of their wage, while entrepreneurs pay a fixed rate, based on the average national wage. Unemployed people are insured by the labor office.

Among the potential solutions posited by economists are single-payer systems as well as other methods of ensuring that health insurance is universal, such as by requiring all citizens to purchase insurance or by limiting the ability of insurance companies to deny insurance to individuals or vary price between individuals.

==== Private insurance ====
In private health insurance, premiums are paid directly from employers, associations, individuals and families to insurance companies, which pool risks across their membership base. Private insurance includes policies sold by commercial for-profit firms, non-profit companies and community health insurers. Generally, private insurance is voluntary in contrast to social insurance programs, which tend to be compulsory.

In some countries with universal coverage, private insurance often excludes certain health conditions that are expensive and the state health care system can provide coverage. For example, in the United Kingdom, one of the largest private health care providers is Bupa, which has a long list of general exclusions even in its highest coverage policy, most of which are routinely provided by the National Health Service. In the Netherlands, which has regulated competition for its main insurance system (but is subject to a budget cap), insurers must cover a basic package for all enrollees, but may choose which additional services they offer in supplementary plans; which most people possess.

The Planning Commission of India has also suggested that the country should embrace insurance to achieve universal health coverage. General tax revenue is currently used to meet the essential health requirements of all people.

==== Community-based health insurance ====
A particular form of private health insurance that has often emerged, if financial risk protection mechanisms have only a limited impact, is community-based health insurance. Individual members of a specific community pay to a collective health fund which they can draw from when they need medical care. Contributions are not risk-related and there is generally a high level of community involvement in the running of these plans. Community-based health insurance generally only play a limited role in helping countries move towards universal health coverage. Challenges includes inequitable access by the poorest that health service utilization of members generally increase after enrollment.

=== Tax-based financing ===
In tax-based financing, individuals contribute to the provision of health services through various taxes or mandatory contributions. These are typically pooled across the whole population unless local governments raise and retain tax revenues. Some countries (notably Spain, the United Kingdom, Ireland, New Zealand, Italy, Brazil, Portugal, India and the Nordic countries) choose to fund public health care directly from taxation alone. Other countries with insurance-based systems effectively meet the cost of insuring those unable to insure themselves via social security arrangements funded from taxation, either by directly paying their medical bills or by paying for insurance premiums for those affected. Public subsidies can increase the health care coverage for low income persons.

==== Bismarck model ====
In a social health insurance system, contributions from workers, the self-employed, enterprises and governments are pooled into single or multiple funds on a compulsory basis. This is based on risk pooling. The social health insurance model is also referred to as the Bismarck Model, after German Chancellor Otto von Bismarck, who introduced the first universal health care system in Germany in the 19th century. The funds typically contract with a mix of public and private providers for the provision of a specified benefit package. Preventive and public health care may be provided by these funds or responsibility kept solely by the Ministry of Health. Within social health insurance, a number of functions may be executed by parastatal or non-governmental sickness funds, or in a few cases, by private health insurance companies. Social health insurance is used in a number of Western European countries and increasingly in Eastern Europe as well as in Israel and Japan.

=== Single-payer ===
Single-payer health care is a system in which the government, rather than private insurers, pays for all health care costs. Single-payer systems may contract for healthcare services from private organizations, or own and employ healthcare resources and personnel (as was the case in England before the introduction of the Health and Social Care Act). In some instances, such as Italy and Spain, both these realities may exist at the same time. "Single-payer" thus describes only the funding mechanism and refers to health care financed by a single public body from a single fund and does not specify the type of delivery or for whom doctors work. Although the fund holder is usually the state, some forms of single-payer use a mixed public-private system.

== Implementation and comparisons ==
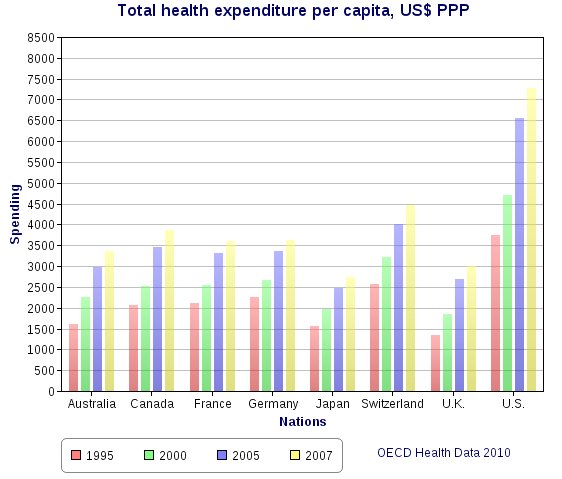
Health spending per capita, in US$ purchasing power parity-adjusted, among various OECD countries. For later data see List of countries by total health expenditure per capita.

Universal health care systems vary according to the degree of government involvement in providing care or health insurance. In some countries, such as Canada, the UK, Italy, Australia, and the Nordic countries, the government has a high degree of involvement in the commissioning or delivery of health care services and access is based on residence rights, not on the purchase of insurance. Others have a much more pluralistic delivery system, based on obligatory health with contributory insurance rates related to salaries or income and usually funded by employers and beneficiaries jointly. subnational disparities remain a barrier to achieving total coverage in emerging economies.

Sometimes, the health funds are derived from a mixture of insurance premiums, salary-related mandatory contributions by employees or employers to regulated sickness funds, and by government taxes. These insurance based systems tend to reimburse private or public medical providers, often at heavily regulated rates, through mutual or publicly owned medical insurers. A few countries, such as the Netherlands and Switzerland, operate via privately owned but heavily regulated private insurers, which are not allowed to make a profit from the mandatory element of insurance but can profit by selling supplemental insurance.

Universal health care is a broad concept that has been implemented in several ways. The common denominator for all such programs is some form of government action aimed at extending access to health care as widely as possible and setting minimum standards. Most implement universal health care through legislation, regulation, and taxation. Legislation and regulation direct what care must be provided, to whom, and on what basis. Usually, some costs are borne by the patient at the time of consumption, but the bulk of costs come from a combination of compulsory insurance and tax revenues. Some programs are paid for entirely out of tax revenues. In others, tax revenues are used either to fund insurance for the very poor or for those needing long-term chronic care.

A critical concept in the delivery of universal healthcare is that of population healthcare. This is a way of organizing the delivery, and allocating resources, of healthcare (and potentially social care) based on populations in a given geography with a common need (such as asthma, end of life, urgent care). Rather than focus on institutions such as hospitals, primary care, community care etc. the system focuses on the population with a common as a whole. This includes people currently being treated, and those that are not being treated but should be (i.e. where there is health inequity). This approach encourages integrated care and a more effective use of resources.

The United Kingdom National Audit Office in 2003 published an international comparison of ten different health care systems in ten developed countries, nine universal systems against one non-universal system (the United States), and their relative costs and key health outcomes. A wider international comparison of 16 countries, each with universal health care, was published by the World Health Organization in 2004. In some cases, government involvement also includes directly managing the health care system, but many countries use mixed public-private systems to deliver universal health care.

== Health Coverage Reports ==
The 2023 report from the WHO and the World Bank indicates that the advancement towards Universal Health Coverage (UHC) by the year 2030 has not progressed since 2015. The UHC Service Coverage Index (SCI) has remained constant at a score of 68 from 2019 to 2021. It is reported that catastrophic out-of-pocket (OOP) health expenditures have impacted over 1 billion individuals globally. Additionally, in the year 2019, it was found that 2 billion people experienced financial difficulties due to health expenses, with ongoing, significant disparities in coverage. The report suggests several strategies to mitigate these challenges: it calls for the acceleration of essential health services, sustained attention to infectious disease management, improvement in health workforce and infrastructure, the elimination of financial barriers to care, an increase in pre-paid and pooled health financing, policy initiatives to curtail OOP expenses, a focus on primary healthcare to reinforce overall health systems, and the fortification of collaborative efforts to achieve UHC. These measures aim to increase health service coverage by an additional 477 million individuals by the year 2023 and to continue progress towards covering an extra billion people by the 2030 deadline.

== Politics and criticism ==
Universal health care is politically contested, with debates focusing on the proper scope of government, efficiency, equity, individual liberty, and long-term economic and health outcomes.

Critics of single-payer models argue that they lead to longer wait times and lower quality of care due to budget constraints, overburdened staff, and non-price rationing. In Canada, for example, many patients have historically sought care in the United States to avoid delays. Government-run or heavily price-controlled systems are often described by critics as less efficient than competitive private alternatives, with risks of waste, mismanagement, overuse, and eventual insolvency or fiscal strain. Maintaining such systems can require high taxes, as seen in the Nordic countries, Australia, and New Zealand. In single-payer systems, governments sometimes impose price controls and global budgets to contain spending. This produces health care rationing through queues. In the United Kingdom's National Health Service there documented cases of corridor care and delays. Critics contend single-payer implementation would substantially raise government expenditures and tax burdens.

From libertarian perspective, these outcomes stem from alleged incentive problems they consider inherent to the system. When most payments are made by third parties (government or insurers) rather than patients directly, individuals may have less incentive to economize, which in turn could drive up utilization and costs.

A 2025 Pew Research Center poll found 66% support that all Americans have some health care coverage. Given the high prevalence of uninsured people in the United States universal health care coverage would increase health care access for more than 25 million Americans. In the United States the support for private or public implementation of universal health care is mixed. Some argue single-payer healthcare represents "unnecessary government overreach" into the lives of American citizens and employers as it denies them individual choice and personal responsibility. It may limit the choices available to patients, as they argue government may control which treatments and medications are covered.

According to a 2020 study published in The Lancet, the proposed universal healthcare could save 68,000 lives and $450 billion in national healthcare expenditure annually through redistribution and reduced administrative costs. A 2022 study published in the PNAS found that a universal healthcare system could have saved 212,000 lives and averted over $100 billion in medical costs during the COVID-19 pandemic in the United States in 2020 alone.

== See also ==
- Health care
- Health care rationing
- Health economics
- Health promotion
- Health law
- Health insurance cooperative
- Health spending as a percent of GDP by country (gross domestic product)
- Healthcare reform debate in the United States
- Incremental cost-effectiveness ratio
- List of countries by total health expenditure per capita
- List of countries with universal health care
- National health insurance
- Primary healthcare
- Public health
- Right to health
- Socialized medicine
- Two-tier healthcare
- Universal Health Coverage Day
