= Health care in Cyprus =

Life expectancy at birth in Cyprus

Health care in Cyprus accounted for 7% of its GDP in 2014. Between 2010 and 2014, health care spending increased from $1,705 per capita to $2,062 per capita. Cyprus has a multi-payer health care system that consists of a public and private sector. The public sector is funded by payroll, earnings taxes, and employer contributions. The public sector healthcare provides social insurance for the employed, self-employed, and for several types of civil servant.

A universal national health system, known as GESY, was implemented in Cyprus in June 2019. The system was created as part of a requirement in the bail-out agreement with the International Monetary Fund, the European Commission and the European Central Bank (the Troika). The new system aims to provide affordable and effective medical care to all people residing permanently in Cyprus.

== General Healthcare System (GeSY) ==
Cyprus's universal healthcare system, GESY, launched on June 1, 2019. As of June 2022, 917,000 Cypriots have registered with a general practitioner through the GESY system, which is roughly the current population of the Republic of Cyprus.

In 2013 Cyprus decided to establish a national health care system, with support from creditors of the International Monetary Fund, European Central Bank, and European Commission. A Cyprus national health system was predicted to increase coordination, reduce waste, and be more fiscally responsible. Inefficiencies in the system include overlapping services between the public and private health service providers and "poor communication and coordination" between the sectors. Cyprus ranks the highest among European Union nations on out-of-pocket health spending. Public healthcare operates with the state's Ministry of Health providing control and funding. Cyprus outperforms the EU average of dentists per capita (91 for every 100,000 people) and underperforms in pharmacists per capita (21 for every 100,000 people).

George Pamporidis, the Minister of Health, announced in September 2015 that he intended to establish a National Health Service by 2017. He has previously pledged to clear our corruption in Cyprus' public hospitals. Establishment of an operational NHS was a promise Cyprus made as part of the bailout programme with the Troika of international lenders. Pamporidis proposed a 2% special tax (1% for employers and 1% for employees) to finance a "mini-NHS".

The current dual sector system is in the process of being replaced with a national health system that aims to provide universal coverage. The National Health System was supposed to save €292 million from 2016-2025 compared to the predicted expenditures of the current system. The public health sector managed by the Ministry of Health provided free services to approximately 83% of the population. Public coverage includes dental, mental health and pharmaceutical services, as well as general public health resources.

The three government bills and regulations introducing the General Healthcare System, GeSY, were agreed by parliament on 16 June 2017. It is supposed to be fully operational by 1 July 2020. Collection of contributions for the first stage of implementation started on 1 March 2019.

== OKYpY ==
Sir David Nicholson was appointed chairman of the newly established State Health Services Organisation (Greek: ΟΚΥπΥ (OKYpY)) in 2018. Thomas Antoniou is the president.

In March 2019 it was reported that more than 1,200 doctors have signed up to work for it. About 1,300-1,400 doctors will be required for its first phase.

== International comparisons ==
The Euro health consumer index ranked Cyprus 26th of 35 European countries in 2015, commenting that it did not really have a public healthcare system in the general European meaning of the term.

== See also ==
- Health in Cyprus
- Nicosia Old General Hospital
- History of medicine in Cyprus
