= Healthcare in Costa Rica =

Life expectancy in Costa Rica

Costa Rica provides universal health care to its citizens and permanent residents. Both the private and public health care systems in Costa Rica are continually being upgraded. Statistics from the World Health Organization (WHO) frequently place Costa Rica in the top country rankings in the world for long life expectancy. WHO's 2000 survey ranked Costa Rica as having the 36th best health care system, placing it one spot above the United States at the time. In addition, the UN (United Nations) has ranked Costa Rica's public health system within the top 20 worldwide and the number 1 in Latin America.

The Human Rights Measurement Initiative finds that Costa Rica is fulfilling 94.7% of what it should be fulfilling for the right to health based on its level of income. When looking at the right to health with respect to children, Costa Rica achieves 97.7% of what is expected based on its current income. In regards to the right to health amongst the adult population, the country achieves 94.8% of what is expected based on the nation's level of income. Costa Rica falls into the "fair" category when evaluating the right to reproductive health because the nation is fulfilling 91.7% of what the nation is expected to achieve based on the resources (income) it has available.

== Costs ==
In the early 1970s, the Ministry of Health was heavily subsidized by foreign aid. By 1977, health programs had been so successful that US Aid for International Development in the sector was ended, as the country was found "too healthy" to continue being a recipient. In 2001, total spending on health care was 7% of GDP, with 3/4 of that being the public sector. Currently, costs tend to be much less than doctor, hospital, and prescription costs in the U.S. The country spends one tenth as much per capita on health care as the United States, focusing on preventive care.

== Public ==
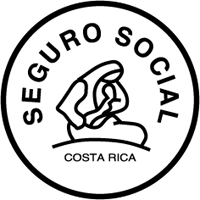
Costa Rican Social Security Fund Logo

The Costa Rican Social Security Fund or Caja Costarricense de Seguro Social (as it is known in Spanish) is in charge of most of the nation's public health sector. Its role in public health (as the administrator of health institutions) is key in Costa Rica, playing an important part in the state's national health policy making. Worker and employer contribution are mandated by law, under the principle of solidarity. Workers need to be cover by a "poliza de riesgo del trabajo" an insurance policy that complements the health care provided by the "Caja" for injuries related to labor risks.

Caja services are guaranteed to all residents, including the uninsured. In 1989 this was expanded to include undocumented immigrants as well, which constituted up to 8% of the population at the time. The percent of residents with health insurance increased gradually, as the program was originally only intended for urban workers. It was not until 1961 that universal mandatory coverage became a stated goal. After reaching a peak of 92% coverage in 1990, rates have remained around 88%. 12% of the insured are low-income residents who are eligible to have their coverage paid entirely by the state, based on a means-test. 87% of the uninsured enter a hospital via the emergency room, compared to only 58% of the insured.

Emergency care is provided free of charge to all residents. This governmental entity's functions encompass both the administrative and functional aspects. It has the obligation (as a public institution) to formulate and execute health programs that are both preventive (such as: vaccination, informational, fumigation, etc.) and healing (such as: surgery, radiation therapy, pharmacy, clinical, etc.) in nature. Services "are aimed disproportionately" toward underprivileged Nicaraguan and Colombian immigrants and indigenous communities. Spending is relatively progressive, with the poorest quintile receiving 29% of spending while the richest quintile only receives 11%.

In 2000, 90% of the country's doctors were employed by the public sector, but 1/3 of those also maintained a private practice. During the decade of the 1990s the percentage of all medical staff (not just doctors) who worked in the private sector increased from 10% to almost 25%. As more doctors opt for the more profitable field of private practice, especially in relation to medical tourism, the government has resorted to hiring around 100 Cuban doctors annually to work in the public sector, as of 2010.

Alongside universal health care the government also provides basic dental care. However, this does not include most orthodontic procedures, such as braces.

=== EBAIS ===
The Equipos Básicos de Atención Integral en Salud (EBAIS), or Comprehensive Basic Health Care Team, began operating in 1995, under control of the Social Security Fund. The program had been proposed two years earlier by a bipartisan committee of experts set up by the president to redress decreases in the quality of services that had occurred over the preceding decade. The goal of the program is to ensure that all citizens have access to medical care, including rural residents. EBAIS employees are divided into teams of about five members, including one doctor. Team members visit people at their homes to vaccinate, offer medical advice, check vitals, and dispense medication. They also rectify any standing water situations they observe, which otherwise act as breeding grounds for mosquitoes and their associated diseases. EBAIS designates certain residences as high-risk due to subs-standard housing and amenities or risky health conditions (e.g. teenage pregnancy). Members also address the health of patients' pets, such as ensuring that they are up to date on all necessary vaccinations. There are nearly 1,000 teams, each overseeing the health of 3,500-4,000 individuals.

After an original rejection, $9 million was later granted for the creation of EBAIS by the World Bank. The rest of the $50 million price tag was paid for by the Social Security Fund.

The Costa Rican Social Security Fund is also charged with the administration of the public pension system.

==== Reformed healthcare litigation ====
The development of the current public and private healthcare system in Costa Rica and its movement towards a progressive system came about as a response to a growing constitutional health rights in Costa Rica. The Costa Rican Supreme Court, the Sala IV, released litigations for medications, treatments, and other health care issues. Criticism from inside the health system regarding "the court's jurisprudence elevated the right to health above financial considerations, and as a result posed a threat to the financial well-being of the state-run health care system."

A 2014 study researched successful health rights litigation and showed that less than 70% of favorable rulings were for low-priority medications in Costa Rica, revealing an unfair access to medications. To address these criticisms, the Sala IV partnered with the Cochrane Collaboration to integrate medical professional evaluations in its decision-making process for claims seeking access to medication. Then a new study was conducted researching the court's reformed ruling process and whether it has changed in favor of the health rights conversation. It revealed that the probability of winning a medication lawsuit has increased drastically over time and that the percent of rulings granting experimental medications has declined while the percent granting high-priority medications increased. Based on the results, in comparison to the court's pre-reform process, the reformed new process has led to some minor gains in fairness.

== Private ==
Costa Rica is a popular destination for medical tourism because of the beautiful surroundings, low costs, abundance of bilingual medical personnel, and medical reputation. Over 40,000 Americans come to the country annually as medical tourists. Private insurance plans are available through the government-owned insurance company(INS). Private plans include dental work, optometry, well-visit and annual check-ups. 80% of the costs are covered for prescription drugs, certain medical exams, sick visit and hospitalization. Surgeon and aesthetician costs are covered at full cost. Currently, private medical insurance costs about $60–$250/month per person, depending on gender, age, other factors. Reasons for opting for private health care include shorter wait times and the ability to choose one's doctor. Around 30% of the population utilizes private health services at least once a year, according to surveys. Costa Rica has three internationally accredited private hospitals. The four largest private hospitals in Costa Rica are CIMA in the suburbs of San Jose, Clínica Biblica in the center of San Jose, Clínica Católica and Hospital Clinica UNIBE in the suburbs of San Jose. Domestic private health insurance was not legalized until 2006. International private insurance companies were not allowed to operate in the country until a Free Trade Agreement was signed with the United States in 2009.

== Pharmacy ==
Many drugs (like birth control pills, high cholesterol medication, migraine medicine, etc.) are available in Costa Rica without a prescription. Many common problems can be accurately diagnosed and treated by pharmacists. Also, most major pharmacies have a doctor on staff. Most Costa Ricans head to the pharmacy first and consult with the pharmacist or doctor on staff. Pharmacy staff will direct patients to the hospital for additional treatments or when the staff is unable to diagnose.

== Childbirth ==
Abortion in Costa Rica is restricted to situations that preserve the life or physical health of the mother. Abortions are illegal in cases of rape or incest, for social or economic reasons or when the unborn child suffers from medical problems or birth defects.

== Smoking ==
It is illegal to smoke in all public vehicles, public buildings and recreation areas such as parks, stadiums etc.
