= Health in Bulgaria =

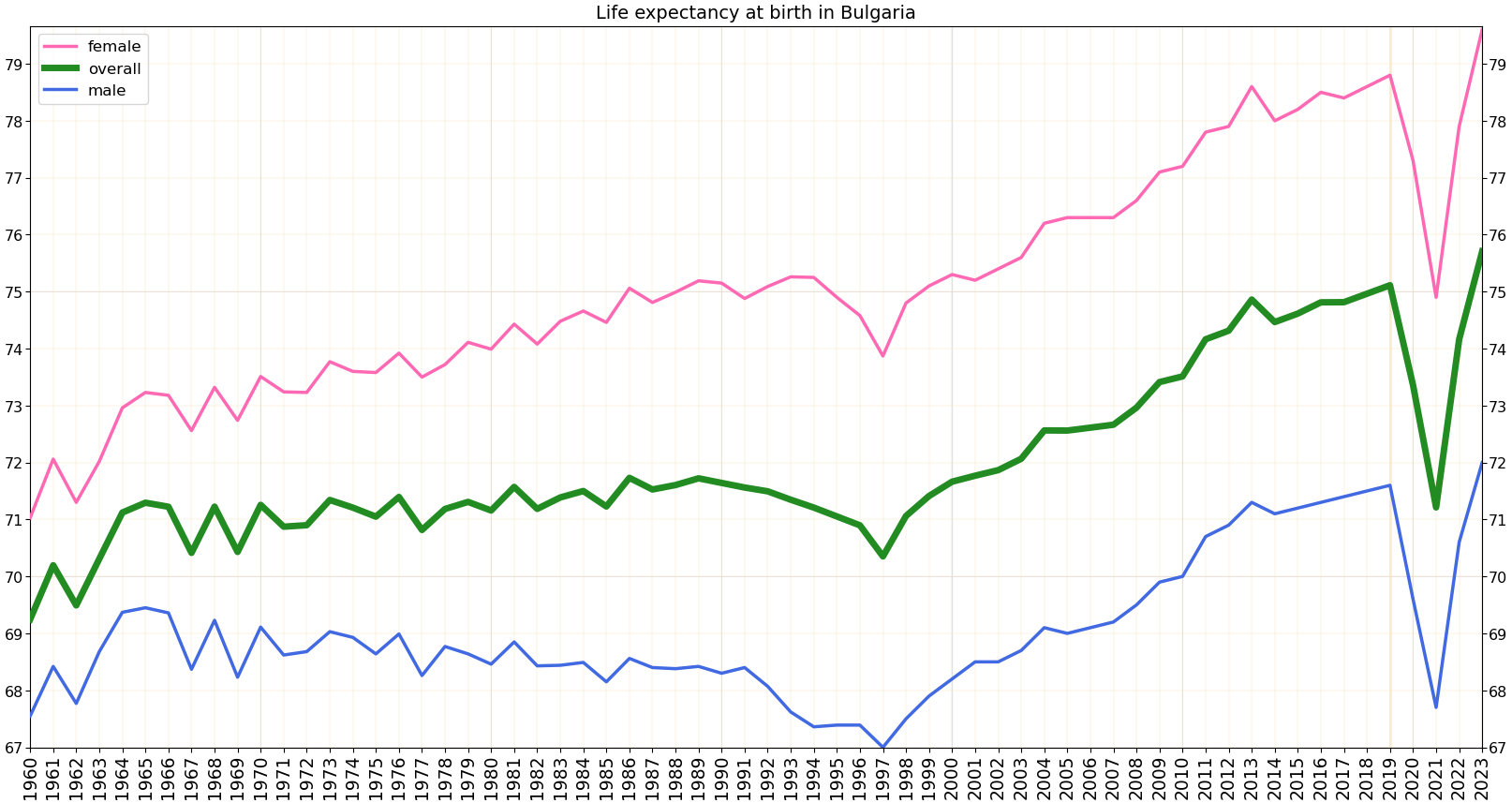
Life expectancy at birth in Bulgaria

Bulgaria had the third highest mortality in Europe, at 708 per 100,000 population in 2015. The four European regions with the highest death rates from diseases of the circulatory system were all in Bulgaria. In the early 2000s, the major natural causes of death were cardiovascular disease (most commonly manifested in strokes), cancer, and respiratory illness. Bulgaria has had a very low incidence rate of human immunodeficiency virus (HIV). Although in 2003 the estimated rate of incidence was less than 0.1 percent of the population, in the early 2000s the number of new case reports increased annually. In 2005 some 86 new cases were reported, bringing the official total to about 600, and 58 new cases were reported in the first half of 2006. In 2010, there were 1,160 HIV-positive persons.

== Healthcare ==
As a former satellite of the Soviet Union, Bulgaria used to have their health system: the Semashko model. This particular system is characterized by having a state monopoly, where there is centralized planning and financing of the health sphere. There were no private structures for providing health services. There were no health insurances; the system was funded directly from the state budget, paid for maintenance, universally accessible, and free for patients.

Bulgaria began overall reform of its antiquated health system, inherited from the communist era, only in 1999. In the 1990s, private medical practices expanded somewhat, but most Bulgarians relied on communist-era public clinics while paying high prices for special care. During that period, national health indicators generally worsened as economic crises substantially decreased health funding.

The subsequent health reform program has introduced mandatory employee health insurance through the National Health Insurance Fund (NHIF), which since 2000 has paid a gradually increasing portion of primary health care costs. Employees and employers pay an increasing, mandatory percentage of salaries, with the goal of gradually reducing state support of health care. Private health insurance plays only a supplementary role. The system also has been decentralized by making municipalities responsible for their own health care facilities, and by 2005 most primary care came from private physicians. Pharmaceutical distribution also was decentralized. According to the survey conducted by the Euro health consumer index in 2015 Bulgaria was among the European countries in which unofficial payments to doctors were reported most commonly.

In the early 2000s, the hospital system was reduced substantially to limit reliance on hospitals for routine care. Anticipated membership in the European Union (2007) was a major motivation for this trend. Between 2002 and 2003, the number of hospital beds was reduced by 56 percent to 24,300. However, the pace of reduction slowed in the early 2000s; in 2004 some 258 hospitals were in operation, compared with the estimated optimal number of 140. Between 2002 and 2004, health care expenditures in the national budget increased from 3.8 percent to 4.3 percent, with the NHIF accounting for more than 60 percent of annual expenditures.

In the 1990s, the quality of medical research and training decreased seriously because of low funding. In the early 2000s, the emphasis of medical and paramedical training, which was conducted in five medical schools, was the preparation of primary-care personnel to overcome shortages resulting from the communist system's long-term emphasis on training specialists. Experts considered that Bulgaria had an adequate supply of doctors but a shortage of other medical personnel. In 2000 Bulgaria had 3.4 doctors, 3.9 nurses, and 0.5 midwives per 1,000 population.
