= Healthcare in Estonia =

Development of life expectancy in Estonia

Healthcare in Estonia is supervised by the Ministry of Social Affairs and funded by general taxation through the National Health Service.

The service is administered by the Estonian Health Insurance Fund (EHIF). An insured person must be either a permanent resident or a legal resident who pays the social tax. All health care providers in Estonia are required to submit the health information of their patients to the digital health information system.

Estonia's health care system is based on compulsory insurance based on solidarity funding and on universal access to services provided by private service providers. All providers of health services are autonomous businesses governed by private law. The single buyer and payment method is the Estonian Health Insurance Fund (Eesti Haigekassa), which pays all contracted providers. The majority of general practitioners work for themselves, privately owned businesses, or local governments. In Estonia, the majority of hospitals are either foundations created by the government, municipalities, or other public organizations, or limited businesses owned by the local government. If the hospital has a contract with the Fund, the Estonian Health Insurance Fund will also pay for necessary treatments received in a private hospital. If no agreement is reached, private medical care is not reimbursed.

== Estonian Health Insurance Fund (EHIF) ==
The Estonian healthcare system is funded through mandatory contributions made through a payroll tax. It accounts for almost two-thirds of all healthcare expenditure in the country. The Estonian Health Insurance Fund (EHIF) is an independent body that acts as the sole purchaser of medical care. It operates through four regional branches, each covering two to six counties, which collect and disburse funds, contract service providers, and provide pharmaceuticals and other health programs.

The health insurance system covers about 95% of the population. Contributions are proportional to employment and salaries, but non-contributing citizens represent almost half of the insured people. The Ministry of Social affairs covers uninsured persons and ambulance services.

== Electronic health record ==
Estonia is a pioneer in the use of electronic health records because when general practice was moved out of hospitals in 1998 the records were kept in the hospitals, so GPs had to start their own system. Madis Tiik established an electronic record system though it was officially illegal until 2002. He was a founding member of the eHealth Foundation and became its chief executive. There is now a central record system which is available to all healthcare professionals and can be viewed by the patient. Some tasks are automated, so that doctors do not have to certify that people are fit to drive. The application automatically checks their medical history.

Estonia was the first country in the world that has implemented a nationwide EHR system, registering virtually all residents' medical history from birth to death. It was launched on 17 December 2008.

Estonia used its existing digital public service software known as X-Road to create the EHR network. Estonia's system was overseen by the Ministry of Social Affairs until the creation of the Estonian e-Health Foundation. Since its implementation, 95% of health data has been digitized. Citizens that participate in the program are given an individual card that is used to access their records, like a national identification.

The cost of this system has been €7.50 per person at the time of creation. Costs can stay low due to Estonia's small population. The system is still too small to create proper diagnosis and track national statistics according to the National Audit Office.

Along with e-Health records, Estonia has also created an e-Prescription service. It allows doctors to create an electronic prescription that is then added to a patient's health card and accessed at a pharmacy to receive the medicine they may require. Now 97% of prescriptions are digital in Estonia.

== Child support ==
Upon giving birth, the Estonian government grants one of the parents 100% of their former salary for 18 months, plus 320 Euros of one-time support per child. After 18 months, the parent has the right to resume her/his former position. In addition, the parent and child receive free healthcare. Parents who did not work before giving birth (unemployed, students, etc.) receive 278 Euros a month; the top salary is capped at 2,157 Euros a month. These measures, which have been in force from 2005, have not been proven to have had a major positive effect on the birth rate in Estonia, which has increased already since 2001.

Those policy measures concentrate on the first 18 months of the child's life. After 18 months, the monthly state support to a child goes down to 60 Euros a month (for the first two children) and 100 euros (from third child on), plus free healthcare. There are many exceptions and added bonuses to the rule. For example, the child of a single parent receives additional sum of 19.18 Euros of child support. The child of an army member receives 300 Euros a month, and children in foster families receive 240 Euros a month. Despite considerable variation and fluctuations in the support to the family with children, the majority of Estonian families do not face great hardships and the State of The World's Mothers 2011 report ranked Estonia as the 18th best country in the world to be a mother, ahead of countries like Canada and the United States. The 2014 report ranked the neighboring Finland as the best country to be a mother in. According to the CIA World Factbook, Estonia has the 37th lowest maternal death rate in the world.
