= Health care systems by country =

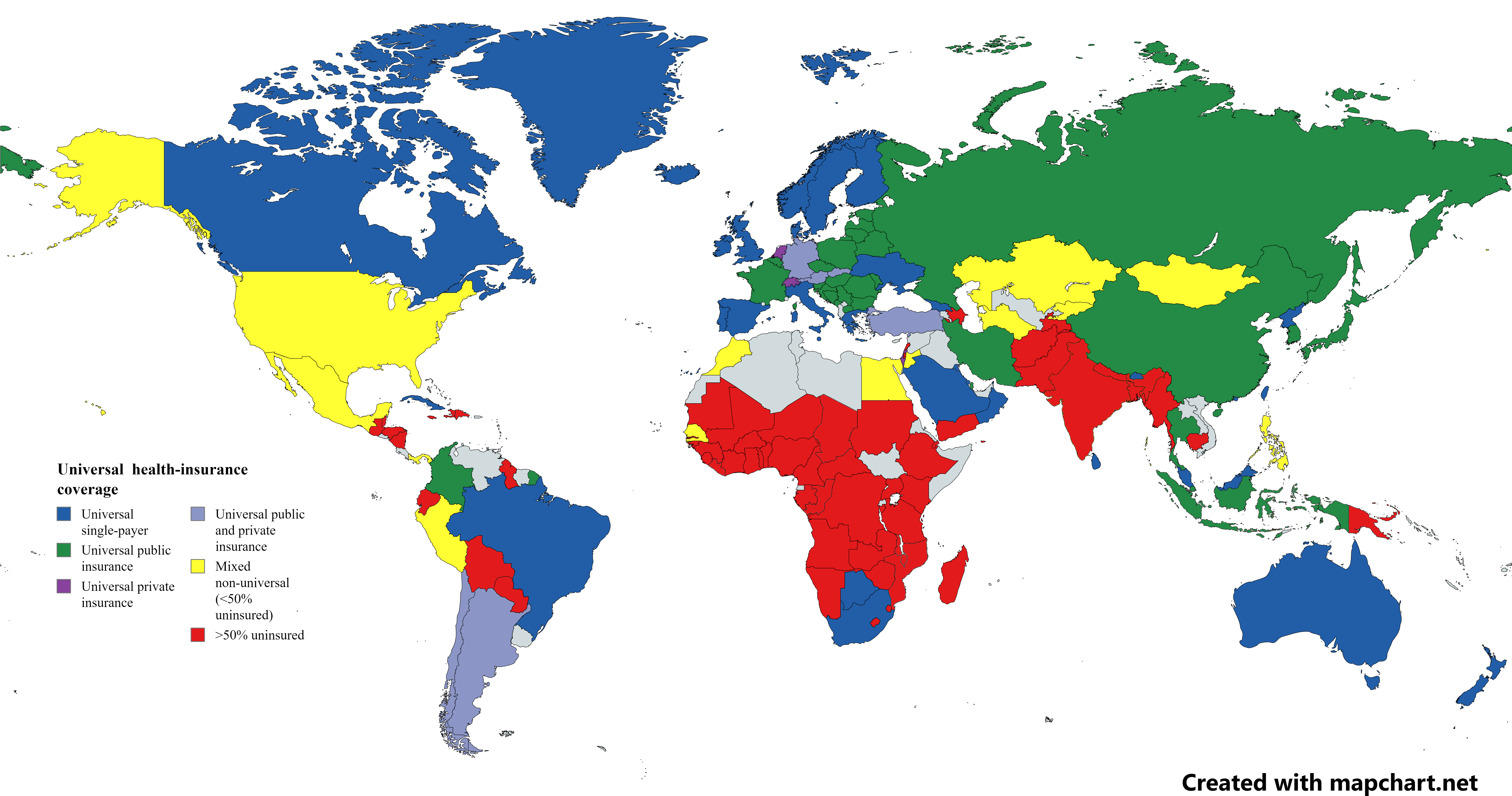
Universal health-insurance coverage systems by country

Examples of health care systems of the world, sorted by continent, are as follows.

== Classification ==
Following sources of financing of systems can be categorized:

- Single-payer healthcare: government-funded healthcare is available to all citizens regardless of their income or employment status. Some countries may provide healthcare to non-citizen residents, while some may require them to buy private insurance
- Public insurance: In some countries workers have social insurance. Usually government withholds part of their wage, which is divided between employee and employer. People who are retired, unemployed or in education also have the right to healthcare paid by government but sometimes need to register for it manually.
- Private insurance: Operated by private insurance companies where beneficiaries regularly pay a premium to be covered. Private insurance can be nonprofit or for-profit.
- Out of pocket: Direct payment from the patient. This can be co-payments or co-insurance, or the full cost of the healthcare service.
- Foreign aid

Countries in the table are categorized by the main system of financing their healthcare. Many countries in the world have multi-tiered healthcare systems with different ways of financing healthcare for different people and purposes.

== Table ==
- Coverage: See row references, and the 2011 reference: "Estimate of health insurance coverage as a percentage of total population. Coverage includes affiliated members of health insurance or estimation of the population having free access to health care services provided by the State."
- Asterisk (*) indicates "Healthcare in LOCATION" or "Health in LOCATION" links.

Health care systems by country.
Location	Coverage	Financing system
Albania *	23.6%	Single-payer
Algeria *	85.2%	Public-private insurance system
American Samoa	3%	N/A
Andorra *	N/A	Public insurance system
Angola *	0%	N/A
Antigua and Barbuda *	51.1%	N/A
Argentina *	96.8%	Public-private insurance system
Armenia *	100%	N/A
Aruba	99.2%	N/A
Australia *	100%	Public-private insurance system
Austria *	99.9%	Public-private insurance system
Azerbaijan *	2.9%	N/A
Bahamas	100%	N/A
Bahrain *	100%	Single-payer
Bangladesh *	1.4%	N/A
Barbados *	100%	N/A
Belarus *	100%	N/A
Belgium *	98.4%	Public insurance system
Belize *	25%	N/A
Benin *	8%	Public insurance system
Bhutan *	90%	Single-payer
Bolivia *	42.7%	N/A
Bosnia and Herzegovina *	59.2%	Public insurance system
Botswana *	N/A	Single-payer
Brazil *	100%	Single-payer
Brunei *	100%	Single-payer
Bulgaria *	94.3%	Public insurance system
Burkina Faso *	1%	N/A
Burundi *	32%	Public insurance system
Cambodia *	26.1%	N/A
Cameroon *	2%	N/A
Canada *	100%	Single-payer
Central African Republic *	6%	N/A
Chad *	1.2%	N/A
Chile *	98.1%	Public-private insurance system
China *	96.9%	Public insurance system
Colombia *	98.4%	Public insurance system
Comoros *	5.3%	N/A
Costa Rica *	93%	N/A
Ivory Coast *	1.2%	N/A
Croatia *	97%	Public insurance system
Cuba *	100%	Single-payer
Cyprus *	65%	Public-private insurance system
Czech Republic *	100%	Multi-payer social insurance system
DR Congo *	10%	N/A
Denmark *	100%	Single-payer
Djibouti *	30%	Public insurance system
Dominica *	13.4%	N/A
Dominican Republic *	26.5%	N/A
Ecuador *	22.8%	N/A
Egypt *	51.1%	N/A
El Salvador *	21.6%	N/A
Estonia *	93.9%	Public insurance system
Eswatini *	6.2%	N/A
Ethiopia *	28.1%	Community-based health insurance
Fiji *	100%	N/A
Finland *	100%	Single-payer
France *	99.9%	Social insurance system
Gabon *	45%	Public insurance system
Gambia	99.9%	N/A
Georgia *	25%	Single-payer
Germany *	100%	Public-private social insurance system
Ghana *	40%	Public insurance system
Greece *	100%	Single-payer
Grenada *	7.4%	N/A
Guatemala *	30%	N/A
Guinea *	0.2%	N/A
Guinea-Bissau *	1.6%	N/A
Guyana *	23.8%	N/A
Haiti *	3.1%	N/A
Honduras *	12%	N/A
Hong Kong *	100%	Single-payer
Hungary *	96%	Public insurance system
Iceland *	100%	Single-payer
India *	12.5%	Public insurance system
Indonesia *	96%	Public insurance system
Iran *	90%	Public insurance system
Ireland *	100%	Single-payer
Israel *	100%	Private health insurance system
Italy *	100%	Single-payer
Jamaica *	20.1%	N/A
Japan *	100%	Public insurance system
Jordan *	75%	N/A
Kazakhstan *	70%	Single-payer
Kenya *	39.4%	Public insurance system
Kuwait *	100%	Single-payer
Kyrgyzstan *	83%	Single-payer
Laos *	11.6%	N/A
Latvia *	100%	Public insurance system
Lebanon *	48.3%	N/A
Lesotho *	17.6%	N/A
Liberia *	5.3%	N/A
Liechtenstein *	95%	Private health insurance system
Lithuania *	99%	Public insurance system
Luxembourg *	100%	Public insurance system
Macau *	N/A	Single-payer
Madagascar *	3.7%	N/A
Malawi *	1.8%	N/A
Malaysia *	100%	Single-payer
Maldives *	30%	Single-payer
Mali *	7%	Community-based health insurance.
Malta *	100%	Single-payer
Mauritania *	6%	N/A
Mauritius *	100%	N/A
Mexico *	77.6%	Public-private insurance system
Moldova *	88%	Public insurance system
Monaco *	N/A	Public insurance system
Mongolia *	81.9%	Single-payer
Montenegro *	95%	Public insurance system
Morocco *	62%	Public insurance system
Mozambique *	2.7%	N/A
Namibia *	28%	N/A
Nepal *	0.1%	N/A
Netherlands *	98.9%	Private health insurance system
New Zealand *	100%	Single-payer
Nicaragua *	12.2%	N/A
Niger *	3.1%	N/A
Nigeria *	3%	N/A
North Korea *	N/A	Single-payer
North Macedonia *	94.9%	Public insurance system
Norway *	100%	Single-payer
Oman *	97%	Single-payer
Pakistan *	26.6%	N/A
Palestine *	16.2%	N/A
Panama *	51.8%	N/A
Papua New Guinea *	4.5%	N/A
Paraguay *	23.6%	N/A
Peru *	100%	Public-private insurance system
Philippines *	82%	N/A
Poland *	96.9%	Public insurance system
Portugal *	100%	Single-payer
Qatar *	100%	Public insurance system
Congo *	3.3%	N/A
Romania *	88.8%	Public insurance system
Russia *	88%	Public insurance system
Rwanda *	88%	Public insurance system
Saint Kitts and Nevis *	28.8%	N/A
Saint Lucia *	35.5%	N/A
Saint Vincent and the Grenadines *	9.4%	N/A
San Marino *	N/A	Single-payer
São Tomé and Príncipe *	2.1%	N/A
Saudi Arabia *	100%	Single-payer
Senegal *	50%	Community-based health insurance
Serbia *	92.1%	Public insurance system
Sierra Leone *	0%	N/A
Singapore *	100%	Public insurance system
Slovakia *	95.5%	Public-private social insurance system
Slovenia *	100%	Social insurance system
South Africa *	100%	Single-payer
South Korea *	100%	Public insurance system
Spain *	100%	Single-payer
Sri Lanka *	100%	Single-payer
Sudan *	46%	N/A
Sweden *	100%	Single-payer
Switzerland *	100%	Private health insurance system
Syria *	90%	N/A
Taiwan *	99.6%	Single-payer
Tajikistan *	0.3%	N/A
Tanzania *	27%	Community-based health insurance.
Thailand *	98%	N/A
Togo *	4%	N/A
Trinidad and Tobago *	N/A	Single-payer
Tunisia *	85%	Public insurance system
Turkey *	99.3%	Public-private insurance system
Turkmenistan *	82.3%	N/A
Uganda *	2%	N/A
Ukraine *	100%	Single-payer
United Arab Emirates *	100%	N/A
United Kingdom *	100%	Single-payer
United States *	92%	Mixed non-universal • Maryland: Private Universal Insurance System • Colorado, Washington, Massachusetts: Public-Private Universal Healthcare
Uruguay *	97.2%	N/A
Uzbekistan *	100%	Single-payer
Vanuatu *	100%	N/A
Venezuela *	100%	N/A
Vietnam *	93.4%	N/A
Yemen *	42%	N/A
Zambia *	8.4%	N/A
Zimbabwe *	1%	N/A

=== Notes ===
==== Japan ====
Population by coverage:

- 59% – employment-based insurance plans
- 27% – Citizen Health Insurance plans for nonemployed individuals
- 12.7% – Health Insurance for the Elderly plans
- 1.7% – Public Social Assistance Program, for impoverished people

Additionally 70% of people have supplementary private insurance.

==== Russia ====
Funded by federal, regional and municipal budgets and by separate employer's tax payments, but medical aid in state and municipal health establishments in all cases is available for free to all citizens, foreign permanent residents, foreign temporary residents, stateless persons and refugees regardless of their income or employment status.

==== United States ====
- Single-payer for citizens over 65 (Medicare)
- Public insurance for some low-income people (Medicaid)
- Private health insurance
- Out-of-pocket for uninsured population

== Africa ==
=== Algeria ===
When Algeria gained its independence from France in 1962, there were only around 300 doctors across the whole country and no proper system of healthcare. Over the next few decades, great progress was made in building up the health sector, with the training of doctors and the creation of many health facilities. Today, Algeria has an established network of hospitals (including university hospitals), clinics, medical centres and small health units or dispensaries. While equipment and medicines may not always be the latest available, staffing levels are high and the country has one of the best healthcare systems in Africa. Access to health care is enhanced by the requirement that doctors and dentists work in public health for at least five years. The government provides universal health care.

=== Cape Verde ===
Medical facilities in Cape Verde are limited, and some medicines are in short supply or unavailable. There are hospitals in Praia and Mindelo, with smaller medical facilities in other places. The islands of Brava and Santo Antão no longer have functioning airports so air evacuation in the event of a medical emergency is nearly impossible from these two islands. Brava also has limited inter-island ferry service.

=== Eritrea ===
Eritrea is one of the few countries to be on target to meet its Millennium Development Goal (MDG) targets for health. Researchers at the Overseas Development Institute have identified the high prioritisation of health and education both within the government and amongst Eritreans at home and abroad. Innovative multi-sectoral approaches to health were also identified with the success. About one-third of the population lives in extreme poverty, and more than half survives on less than US$1 per day. Health care and welfare resources generally are believed to be poor, although reliable information about conditions is often difficult to obtain. In 2001, the most recent year for which figures are available, the Eritrean government spent 5.7 percent of gross domestic product on national health accounts. The World Health Organization (WHO) estimated that in 2004 there were only three physicians per 100,000 people in Eritrea. The two-year war with Ethiopia, coming on the heels of a 30-year struggle for independence, negatively affected the health sector and the general welfare. The rate of prevalence of human immunodeficiency virus/acquired immune deficiency syndrome (HIV/AIDS), in Eritrea is believed to be at 0.7%(2012)which is reasonably low. In the decade since 1995, impressive results have been achieved in lowering maternal and child mortality rates and in immunizing children against childhood diseases. In 2008 average life expectancy was slightly less than 63 years, according to the WHO. Immunisation and child nutrition has been tackled by working closely with schools in a multi-sectoral approach; the number of children vaccinated against measles almost doubled in seven years, from 40.7% to 78.5% and the underweight prevalence among children decreased by 12% in 1995–2002 (severe underweight prevalence by 28%). This has helped to some small extent even out rural-urban and rich-poor inequity in health.

=== Ethiopia ===
Throughout the 1990s, the government, as part of its reconstruction program, devoted ever-increasing amounts of funding to the social and health sectors, which brought corresponding improvements in school enrollments, adult literacy, and infant mortality rates. These expenditures stagnated or declined during the 1998–2000 war with Eritrea, but in the years since, outlays for health have grown steadily. In 2000–2001, the budget allocation for the health sector was approximately US$144 million; health expenditures per capita were estimated at US$4.50, compared with US$10 on average in sub-Saharan Africa. In 2000 the country counted one hospital bed per 4,900 population and more than 27,000 people per primary health care facility. The physician to population ratio was 1:48,000, the nurse to population ratio, 1:12,000. Overall, there were 20 trained health providers per 100,000 inhabitants. These ratios have since shown some improvement. Health care is disproportionately available in urban centers; in rural areas where the vast majority of the population resides, access to health care varies from limited to nonexistent. As of the end of 2003, the United Nations (UN) reported that 4.4 percent of adults were infected with human immunodeficiency virus/acquired immune deficiency syndrome (HIV/AIDS); other estimates of the rate of infection ranged from a low of 7 percent to a high of 18 percent. Whatever the actual rate, the prevalence of HIV/AIDS has contributed to falling life expectancy since the early 1990s. According to the Ministry of Health, one-third of current young adult deaths are AIDS-related. Malnutrition is widespread, especially among children, as is food insecurity. Because of growing population pressure on agricultural and pastoral land, soil degradation, and severe droughts that have occurred each decade since the 1970s, per capita food production is declining. According to the UN and the World Bank, Ethiopia at present suffers from a structural food deficit such that even in the most productive years, at least 5 million Ethiopians require food relief.

In 2002 the government embarked on a poverty reduction program that called for outlays in education, health, sanitation, and water. A polio vaccination campaign for 14 million children has been carried out, and a program to resettle some 2 million subsistence farmers is underway. In November 2004, the government launched a five-year program to expand primary health care. In January 2005, it began distributing antiretroviral drugs, hoping to reach up to 30,000 HIV-infected adults.

=== Ghana ===
In Ghana, most health care is provided by the government, but hospitals and clinics run by religious groups also play an important role. Some for-profit clinics exist, but they provide less than 2% of health services. Health care is very variable through the country. The major urban centres are well served, but rural areas often have no modern health care. Patients in these areas either rely on traditional medicine or travel great distances for care. In 2005, Ghana spent 6.2% of GDP on health care, or US$30 per capita. Of that, approximately 34% was government expenditure.

=== Guinea ===
Guinea has been reorganizing its health system since the Bamako Initiative of 1987 formally promoted community-based methods of increasing accessibility of primary health care to the population, including community ownership and local budgeting, resulting in more efficient and equitable provision of drugs and other essential health care resources.

In June 2011, the Guinean government announced the establishment of an air ticket solidarity levy on all flights taking off from national soil, with funds going to UNITAID to support expanded access to treatment for HIV/AIDS, tuberculosis and malaria. Guinea is among the growing number of countries and development partners using market-based transactions taxes and other innovative financing mechanisms to expand financing options for health care in resource-limited settings.

=== Mali ===
Health in Mali, one of the world's poorest nations, is greatly affected by poverty, malnutrition, and inadequate hygiene and sanitation. Mali's health and development indicators rank among the worst in the world. In 2000 only 62–65 percent of the population was estimated to have access to safe drinking water and only 69 percent to sanitation services of some kind; only 8 percent was estimated to have access to modern sanitation facilities. Only 20 percent of the nation's villages and livestock watering holes had modern water facilities.

Mali is dependent on international development organizations and foreign missionary groups for much of its health care. In 2001 general government expenditures on health constituted 6.8 percent of total general government expenditures and 4.3 percent of gross domestic product (GDP), totaling only about US$4 per capita at an average exchange rate. Medical facilities in Mali are very limited, especially outside of Bamako, and medicines are in short supply. There were only 5 physicians per 100,000 inhabitants in the 1990s and 24 hospital beds per 100,000 in 1998. In 1999 only 36 percent of Malians were estimated to have access to health services within a five-kilometer radius.

=== Morocco ===
According to the United States government, Morocco has inadequate numbers of physicians (0.5 per 1,000 people) and hospital beds (1.0 per 1,000 people) and poor access to water (82 percent of the population) and sanitation (75 percent of the population). The health care system includes 122 hospitals, 2,400 health centers, and 4 university clinics, but they are poorly maintained and lack adequate capacity to meet the demand for medical care. Only 24,000 beds are available for 6 million patients seeking care each year, including 3 million emergency cases. The health budget corresponds to 1.1 percent of gross domestic product and 5.5 percent of the central government budget.

=== Niger ===
Health care system of Niger has a chronic lack of resources and a small number of health providers relative to population. Some medicines are in short supply or unavailable. There are government hospitals in Niamey (with three main hospitals in Niamey, including the Hôpital National de Niamey and the Hôpital National De Lamordé), Maradi, Tahoua, Zinder and other large cities, with smaller medical clinics in most towns. Medical facilities are limited in both supplies and staff, with a small government health care system supplemented by private, charitable, religious, and Non-government organisation operated clinics and public health programs (such as Galmi Hospital near Birnin Konni and Maradi). Government hospitals, as well as public health programmes, fall under the control of the Nigerien Ministry of Health. A number of private for profit clinics ("Cabinets Médical Privé") operate in Niamey. The total expenditure on health per capita in 2005 was Intl $25. There were 377 Physicians in Niger in 2004, a ratio of 0.03 per 10,000 population. In 2003, 89.2 percent of individual expenditures on health care were "out-of-pocket" (paid by the patient).

=== Nigeria ===
Health care provision in Nigeria is a concurrent responsibility of the three tiers of government in the country. However, because Nigeria operates a mixed economy, private providers of health care have a visible role to play in health care delivery. The federal government's role is mostly limited to coordinating the affairs of the university teaching hospitals, while the state government manages the various general hospitals and the local government focus on dispensaries. The total expenditure on health care as % of GDP is 4.6, while the percentage of federal government expenditure on health care is about 1.5%. A long run indicator of the ability of the country to provide food sustenance and avoid malnutrition is the rate of growth of per capita food production; from 1970 to 1990, the rate for Nigeria was 0.25%. Though small, the positive rate of per capita may be due to Nigeria's importation of food products. Historically, health insurance in Nigeria can be applied to a few instances: government-paid health care provided and financed for all citizens, health care provided by government through a special health insurance scheme for government employees and private firms entering contracts with private health care providers. However, there are few people who fall within the three instances. In May 1999, the government created the National Health Insurance Scheme, the scheme encompasses government employees, the organized private sector and the informal sector. Legislative wise, the scheme also covers children under five, permanently disabled persons and prison inmates. In 2004, the administration of Obasanjo further gave more legislative powers to the scheme with positive amendments to the original 1999 legislative act.

=== Senegal ===
The health budget in Senegal has tripled between 1980 and 2000, leading to the Senegalese people leading healthier and longer lives – the life expectancy at birth is approximately 55.34 years for men, 58.09 years for women, and 56.69 years for the entire population. Also, the prevalence rate of AIDS in Senegal is one of the lowest in Africa, at 0.9%. However, large disparities still exist in Senegal's health coverage, with 70% of doctors, and 80% of pharmacists and dentists, living in the nation's capital city, Dakar.

=== South Africa ===
In South Africa, parallel private and public systems exist. The public system serves the vast majority of the population, but is chronically underfunded and understaffed. The wealthiest 20% of the population uses the private system and are far better served. This division in substantial ways perpetuates racial inequalities created in the pre-apartheid segregation era and apartheid era of the 20th century. In 2005, South Africa spent 8.7% of GDP on health care, or US$437 per capita. Of that, approximately 42% was government expenditure.

=== Sudan ===
Outside urban areas, little health care is available in Sudan, helping account for a relatively low average life expectancy of 57 years and an infant mortality rate of 69 deaths per 1,000 live births, low by standards in Middle Eastern but not African countries. For most of the period since independence in 1956, Sudan has experienced civil war, which has diverted resources to military use that otherwise might have gone into health care and training of professionals, many of whom have migrated in search of more gainful employment. In 1996 the World Health Organization estimated that there were only 9 doctors per 100,000 people, most of them in regions other than the South. Substantial percentages of the population lack access to safe water and sanitary facilities. Malnutrition is widespread outside the central Nile corridor because of population displacement from war and from recurrent droughts; these same factors together with a scarcity of medicines make diseases difficult to control. Child immunization against most major childhood diseases, however, had risen to approximately 60 percent by the late 1990s from very low rates in earlier decades. Spending on health care is quite low – only 1 percent of gross domestic product (GDP) in 1998 (latest data). The United Nations placed the rate of human immunodeficiency virus/acquired immune deficiency syndrome (HIV/AIDS) infection in late 2003 at 2.3 percent for adults, quite low by regional standards. The United Nations suggested, however, that the rate could be as high as 7.2 percent. Between 400,000 and 1.3 million adults and children were living with HIV, and AIDS deaths numbered 23,000. As of late 2004, some 4 million persons in the South had been internally displaced and more than 2 million had died or been killed as a result of two decades of war. Comparable figures for Darfur were 1.6 million displaced and 70,000 dead since fighting began there in early 2003.

=== Zimbabwe ===
Zimbabwe now has one of the lowest life expectancies on Earth – 44 for men and 43 for women, down from 60 in 1990. The rapid drop has been ascribed mainly to the HIV/AIDS pandemic. Infant mortality has risen from 59 per thousand in the late 1990s to 123 per 1000 by 2004. The health system has more or less collapsed: By the end of November 2008, three of Zimbabwe's four major hospitals had shut down, along with the Zimbabwe Medical School and the fourth major hospital had two wards and no operating theatres working. Due to hyperinflation, those hospitals still open are not able to obtain basic drugs and medicines. The ongoing political and economic crisis also contributed to the emigration of the doctors and people with medical knowledge. In August 2008, large areas of Zimbabwe were struck by the ongoing cholera epidemic.

== Americas ==
=== Argentina ===
Argentina's health care system is composed of three sectors: the public sector, financed through taxes; the private sector, financed through voluntary insurance schemes; and the social security sector, financed through obligatory insurance schemes. The Ministry of Health and Social Action (MSAS), oversees all three subsectors of the health care system and is responsible for setting of regulation, evaluation and collecting statistics.

Argentina has three sectors. The public sector is funded and managed by Obras Sociales, umbrella organizations for Argentine worker's unions. There are over 300 Obras Sociales in Argentina, each chapter being organized according to the occupation of the beneficiary. These organizations vary greatly in quality and effectiveness. The top 30 chapters hold 73% of the beneficiaries and 75% of resources for all Obras Sociales schemes and the monthly average a beneficiary receives varies from $5–80 per month. MSAS has established a Solidarity Redistribution Fund (FSR) to try to address these beneficiary inequities. Only workers employed in the formal sector are covered under Obras Sociales insurance schemes and after Argentina's economic crisis of 2001, the number of those covered under these schemes fell slightly (as unemployment increased and employment in the informal sector rose). In 1999, there were 8.9 million beneficiaries covered by Obras Sociales. The private health care sector in Argentina is characterized by great heterogeneity and is made up of a great number of fragmented facilities and small networks; it consists of over 200 organizations and covers approximately 2 million Argentines.

Private insurance often overlaps with other forms of health care coverage, thus it is difficult to estimate the degree to which beneficiaries are dependent on the public and private sectors. According to a 2000 report by the IRBC, foreign competition has increased in Argentina's private sector, with Swiss, American and other Latin American health care providers entering the market in recent years. This has been accompanied by little formal regulation. The public system serves those not covered by Obras Sociales or private insurance schemes. It also provides emergency services. According to above-mentioned IRBC report, Argentina's public system exhibits serious structural deterioration and managerial inefficiency; a high degree of administrative centralization at the provincial level; rigidity in its staffing structure and labour relationships; no adequate system of incentives; inadequate information systems on which to base decision-making and control; serious deficits in facilities and equipment maintenance; and a system of management ill-suited to its size. The public system is highly decentralized to the provincial level; often primary care is even under the purview of local townships. Since 2001, the number of Argentines relying on public services has seen an increase. According to 2000 figures, 37.4% of Argentines had no health insurance, 48.8 were covered under Obras Sociales, 8.6% had private insurance, and 3.8% were covered by both Obras Sociales and private insurance schemes.

=== Brazil ===
The Brazilian health system is composed of a large, public, government managed system, the SUS (Sistema Único de Saúde), which serves the majority of the population completely free of charge or any form of fee, and a private sector, managed by health insurance funds and private entrepreneurs.

The public health system, SUS, was established in 1988 by the Brazilian Constitution, and sits on 3 basic principles of universality, comprehensiveness and equity. Universality states that all citizens must have access to health care services, without any form of discrimination, regarding skin color, income, social status, gender or any other variable. There is no form of charging or payment in any public hospitals or clinics, either for Brazilian nationals or foreigners.

Government standards state that citizen's health is the result of multiple variables, including employment, income, access to land, sanitation services, access and quality of health services, education, psychic, social and family conditions, and are entitled to full and complete health care, comprising prevention, treatment and rehabilitation. Equity states that health policies should be oriented towards the reduction of inequalities between population groups and individuals, being the most needed the ones for whom policies should be first directed.

SUS also has guidelines for its implementation, the most peculiar being popular participation, which defines that all policies are to be planned and supervised directly by the population, through local, city, state and national health councils and conferences.

The level of public spending is particularly high in relation to GDP for a country of Brazil's income level and in comparison with its emerging-market peers. Government outlays on health care alone account for nearly 9% of GDP, the second largest item of spending following social protection. In health care, a number of conventional output indicators are not out of step with OECD averages. Following the decentralization of service delivery in the early 1990s, increasing emphasis has appropriately been placed on enhancing preventive care. But, in a decentralized setting, cost-effectiveness depends a great deal on the ability of service deliverers to exploit economies of scale and scope. Experience with inter-municipal initiatives for procurement, as well as flexible arrangements for hospital administration and human-resource management, is by and large positive.

Private Health Insurance is widely available in Brazil and may be purchased on an individual-basis or obtained as a work benefit (major employers usually offer private health insurance benefits). Public health care is still accessible for those who choose to obtain private health insurance. As of March 2007, more than 37 million Brazilians had some sort of private health insurance.

=== Canada ===
Healthcare in Canada is delivered through the provincial and territorial systems of publicly funded single-payer healthcare, informally called Medicare. It is guided by the provisions of the Canada Health Act, adopted during 1984, and is universal. The 2002 Royal Commission, known as the Romanow Report, revealed that Canadians consider universal access to publicly funded health services as a "fundamental value that ensures national health care insurance for everyone wherever they live in the country".

Canadian Medicare provides coverage for approximately 70 percent of Canadians' healthcare needs, and the remaining 30 percent is paid for through the private sector. The 30 percent typically relates to services not covered or only partially covered by Medicare, such as prescription drugs, eye care, medical devices, gender care, psychotherapy, physical therapy and dentistry. About 65-75 percent of Canadians have some form of supplementary health insurance related to the aforementioned reasons; many receive it through their employers or use secondary social programs related to extended coverage for families receiving social assistance or vulnerable demographics, such as seniors, minors, and those with disabilities.

According to the Canadian Institute for Health Information (CIHI), by 2019, Canada's aging population represents an increase in healthcare costs of approximately one percent a year, which is a modest increase. In a 2020 Statistics Canada Canadian Perspectives Survey Series (CPSS), 69 percent of Canadians self-reported that they had excellent or very good physical health—an improvement from 60 percent in 2018. In 2019, 80 percent of Canadian adults self-reported having at least one major risk factor for chronic disease: smoking, physical inactivity, unhealthy eating, or excessive alcohol use. Canada has one of the highest rates of adult obesity among Organisation for Economic Co-operation and Development (OECD) countries attributing to approximately 2.7 million cases of diabetes (types 1 and 2 combined). Four chronic diseases—cancer (a leading cause of death), cardiovascular diseases, respiratory diseases and diabetes account for 65 percent of deaths in Canada. There are approximately 8 million individuals aged 15 and older with one or more disabilities in Canada.

In 2021, the Canadian Institute for Health Information reported that healthcare spending reached $308 billion, or 12.7 percent of Canada's GDP for that year. In 2022 Canada's per-capita spending on health expenditures ranked 12th among healthcare systems in the OECD. Canada has performed close to the average on the majority of OECD health indicators since the early 2000s, and ranks above average for access to care, but the number of doctors and hospital beds are considerably below the OECD average. The Commonwealth Funds 2021 report comparing the healthcare systems of 11 high-income countries ranked Canada second-to-last. Identified weaknesses of Canada's system were comparatively higher infant mortality rate, the prevalence of chronic conditions, long wait times, poor availability of after-hours care, and a lack of prescription drugs coverage. An increasing problem in Canada's health system is a shortage of healthcare professionals and hospital capacity.

=== Chile ===
Chile has maintained a dual health care system in which its citizens can voluntarily opt for coverage by either the public National Health Insurance Fund or any of the country's private health insurance companies. 68% of the population is covered by the public fund and 18% by private companies. The remaining 14% is covered by other not-for-profit agencies or has no specific coverage. The system's duality has led to increasing inequalities prompting the Chilean government to introduce major reforms in health care provision. Chile's health care system is funded by a universal income tax deduction equal to 7% of every worker's wage. Many private health insurance companies encourage people to pay a variable extra on top of the 7% premium to upgrade their basic health plans. Because of this arrangement, the public and private health subsystems have existed almost completely separate from each other rather than coordinating to achieve common health objectives.

=== Costa Rica ===
Costa Rica provides universal health care to its citizens and permanent residents.

=== Cuba ===
Health care in Cuba consists of a government-coordinated system that guarantees universal coverage and consumes a lower proportion of the nation's GDP (7.3%) than some highly privatised systems (e.g. USA: 16%) (OECD 2008). The system does charge fees in treating elective treatment for patients from abroad, but tourists who fall ill are treated free in Cuban hospitals. Cuba attracts patients mostly from Latin America and Europe by offering care of comparable quality to a developed nation but at much lower prices. Cuba's own health indicators are the best in Latin America and surpass those of the US in some respects (infant mortality rates, underweight babies, HIV infection, immunisation rates, doctor per population rates). (UNDP 2006: Tables 6,7,9,10) In 2005, Cuba spent 7.6% of GDP on health care, or US$310 per capita. Of that, approximately 91% was government expenditure.

=== El Salvador ===
Healthcare in El Salvador is free at the point of delivery. The public health system, which is regulated by the Ministry of Health and Social Welfare, has 30 public hospitals in the country plus various primary care facilities and 27 basic health care systems. According to the law of El Salvador, all individuals are given basic health services in public health institutions.

=== Mexico ===
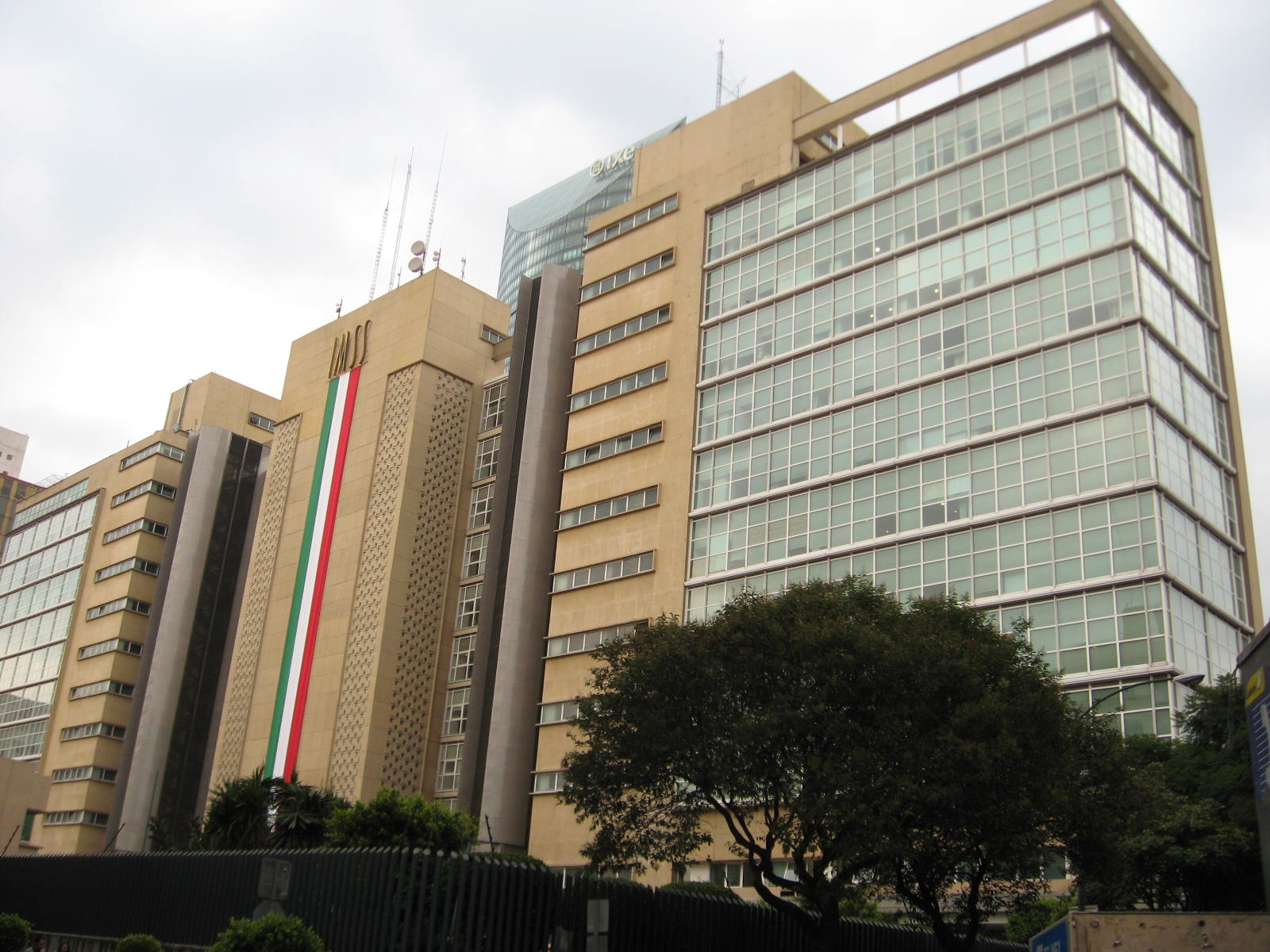
Central offices of the IMSS in downtown Mexico City

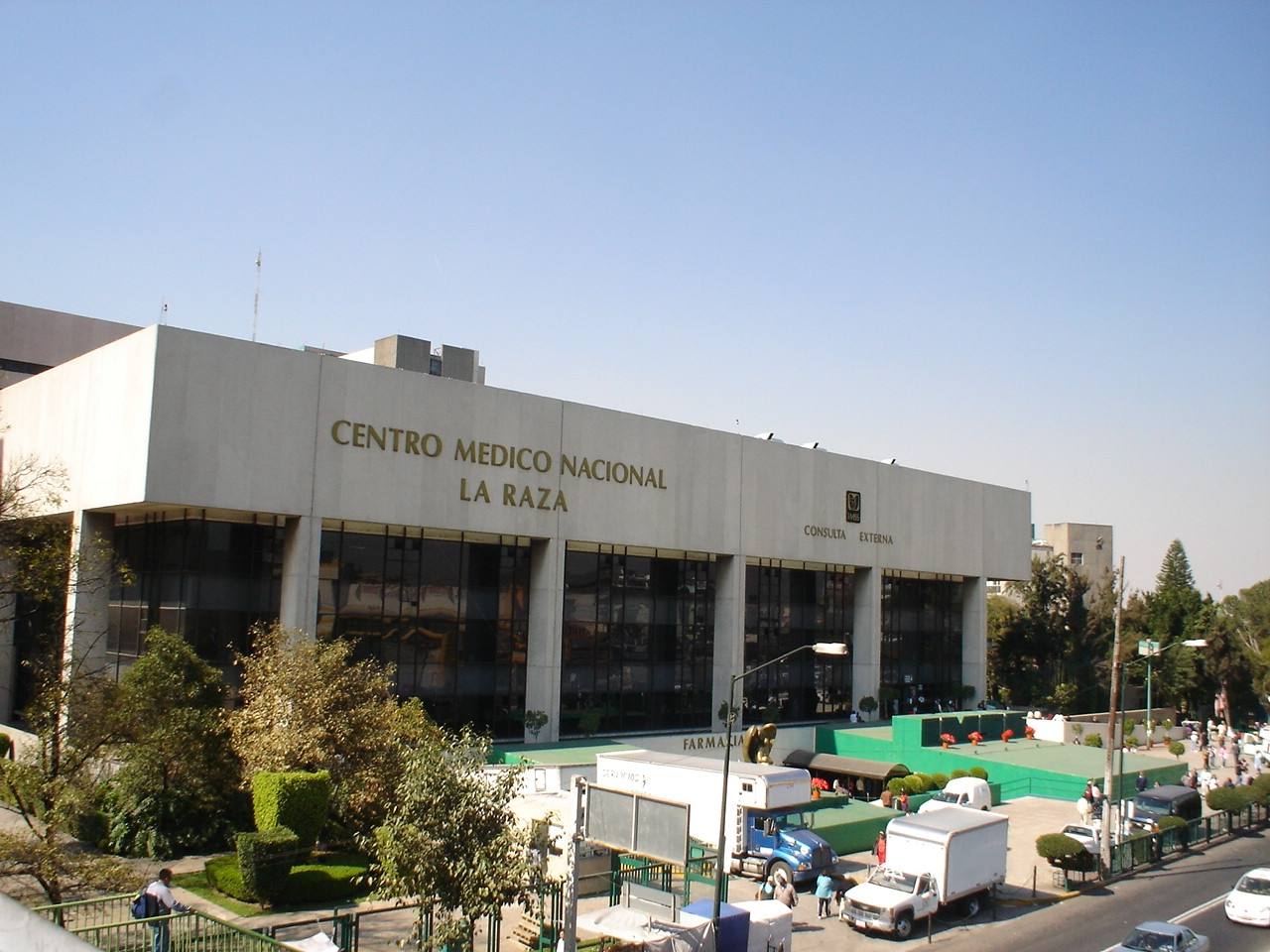
The IMSS La Raza Medical Center, a typical public hospital in Mexico

Health care in Mexico is provided via public institutions or private entities. Health care delivered through private health care organizations operates entirely on the free-market system (e.g. it is available to those who can afford it). Public health care delivery, on the other hand, is accomplished via an elaborate provisioning and delivery system put in place by the Mexican Federal Government and the Mexican Social Security Institute (IMSS).

Advances in medicine and increasing health knowledge have increased the life expectancy in Mexico by an average of 25 years in the last years of the 20th century. Of the 6.6% GDP of government revenue spent on health, this provides only health insurance to 40% of the population who are privately employed. The health care system has three components: the social security institute, governmental services for the un-insured (Seguro Popular), and the private sector that is financed almost completely from out of pocket money. The IMSS, the largest social institution in Latin America, is the governmental institution responsible of executing the Federal Government's health policy. The number of public hospitals in Mexico has increased 41% in ten years from 1985 to 1995.

According to the site www.internationalliving.com, health care in Mexico is described as very good to excellent while being highly affordable, with every medium to large city in Mexico having at least one first-rate hospital. In fact, some California insurers sell health insurance policies that require members to go to Mexico for health care where costs are 40% lower. Some of Mexico's top-rate hospitals are internationally accredited. Americans, particularly those living near the Mexican border, now routinely cross the border into Mexico for medical care. Popular specialties include dentistry and plastic surgery. Mexican dentists often charge 20 to 25 percent of US prices, while other procedures typically cost a third what they would cost in the US.

=== Paraguay ===
In terms of major indicators, health in Paraguay ranks near the median among South American countries. In 2003 Paraguay had a child mortality rate of 1.5 deaths per 1,000 children, ranking it behind Argentina, Colombia, and Uruguay but ahead of Brazil and Bolivia. The health of Paraguayans living outside urban areas is generally worse than those residing in cities. Many preventable diseases, such as Chagas' disease, run rampant in rural regions. Parasitic and respiratory diseases, which could be controlled with proper medical treatment, drag down Paraguay's overall health. In general, malnutrition, lack of proper health care, and poor sanitation are the root of many health problems in Paraguay.

Health care funding from the national government increased gradually throughout the 1980s and 1990s. Spending on health care rose to 1.7 percent of the gross domestic product (GDP) in 2000, nearly triple the 0.6 percent of GDP spent in 1989. But during the past decade, improvement in health care has slowed. Paraguay spends less per capita (US$13–20 per year) than most other Latin American countries. A 2001 survey indicated that 27 percent of the population still had no access to medical care, public or private. Private health insurance is very limited, with pre-paid plans making up only 11 percent of private expenditures on health care. Thus, most of the money spent on private health care (about 88 percent) is on a fee-for-service basis, effectively preventing the poor population from seeing private doctors. According to recent estimates, Paraguay has about 117 physicians and 20 nurses per 100,000 population.

=== Peru ===
Peruvian citizens can opt between a state-owned healthcare system and various private insurance companies. The country has a life expectancy higher than the global average but it also has a high risk of infection, especially near the jungle and other isolated areas, due to the warm climate that favours the reproduction of various insects and bacteria. The mortality rate of the population has been decreasing steadily since 1990 and now stands at 19 deaths per 1000 live births.

=== Trinidad and Tobago ===
Trinidad and Tobago operates under a two-tier health care system. That is, there is the existence of both private health care facilities and public health care facilities. The Ministry of Health is responsible for leading the health sector. The service provision aspect of public health care has been devolved to newly created entities, the Regional Health Authorities (RHAs). The Ministry of Health is shifting its focus to concentrate on policy development, planning, monitoring and evaluation, regulation, financing and research. Citizens can access government-paid health care at public health care facilities where health insurance is not required. The health care system in the country is universal as almost all citizens utilise the services provided. Some, though, opt for private health care facilities for their ailments.

Recently, the Government of Trinidad and Tobago has launched CDAP (Chronic Disease Assistance Programme). The Chronic Disease Assistance Programme provides citizens with government-paid prescription drugs and other pharmaceutical items to combat several health conditions.

=== United States ===
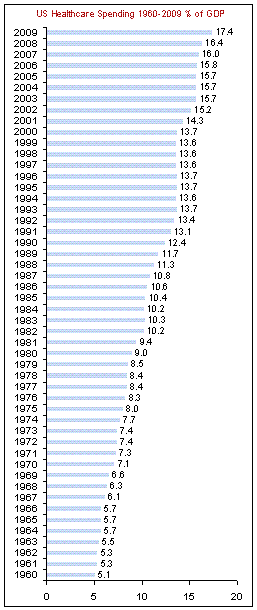
U.S. healthcare spending. Percent of GDP. From OECD Health Data 2011.

The United States currently operates under a mixed market health care system. Government sources (federal, state, and local) account for 45% of U.S. health care expenditures. Private sources account for the remainder of costs, with 38% of people receiving health coverage through their employers and 17% arising from other private payment such as private insurance and out-of-pocket co-pays. Health care reform in the United States usually focuses around three suggested systems, with proposals currently underway to integrate these systems in various ways to provide a number of health care options. First is single-payer, a term meant to describe a single agency managing a single system, as found in many other developed countries as well as some states and municipalities within the United States. Second are employer or individual insurance mandates. Finally, there is consumer-driven health, in which systems, consumers, and patients have more control of how they access care. Over the past thirty years, most of the nation's health care has moved from the second model operating with not-for-profit institutions to the third model operating with for-profit institutions.

In the US, the social and political issues surrounding access to health care have led to vigorous public debate and the almost colloquial use of terms such as health care (medical management of illness), health insurance (reimbursement of health care costs), and public health (the collective state and range of health in a population). As of 2023, 8% of US citizens do not have health insurance. State boards and the Department of Health regulate inpatient care to reduce the national health care deficit. To tackle the problems of the increasing number of uninsured, and costs associated with the US health care system, President Barack Obama says he favors the creation of a universal health care system. However, this view is not shared across the country (see, for example, quotes from New York Times opinion columnist Paul Krugman and Factcheck.org).

A few states have taken serious steps toward universal health care coverage, most notably Minnesota, Massachusetts and Connecticut, with recent examples being the Massachusetts 2006 Health Reform Statute and Connecticut's SustiNet plan to provide quality, affordable health care to state residents. The state of Oregon and the city of San Francisco are both examples of governments that adopted universal healthcare systems for strictly fiscal reasons.

The United States is alone among developed nations in not having a universal health care system; the 2010 Affordable Care Act provides a nationwide health insurance exchange that came to fruition in 2014, but this is not universal in the way similar countries mean it. However, the ACA made several meaningful changes, including barring coverage denial due to pre-existing conditions, creating Medicaid expansion, and creating subsidized insurance exchanges. Healthcare in the U.S. has significant publicly funded components. Medicare covers the elderly and disabled with a historical work record, Medicaid is available to most, but not all, of the poor, and the State Children's Health Insurance Program covers children of low-income families. The Veterans Health Administration directly provides health care to U.S. military veterans through a nationwide network of government hospitals; while active duty service members, retired service members and their dependents are eligible for benefits through TRICARE. Together, these tax-financed programs cover 36.8% of the population and make the government the largest health insurer in the nation. As of 2013, public sources accounted for 64.3% of healthcare spending in the U.S. The U.S. also spends 17.6% of GDP per year on healthcare, ahead of the next highest spender, Germany, at 12.6%.

=== Venezuela ===
The right to health care is guaranteed in the Venezuelan Constitution. Government campaigns for the prevention, elimination, and control of major health hazards have been generally successful. Immunization campaigns have systematically improved children's health, and regular campaigns to destroy disease-bearing insects and to improve water and sanitary facilities have all boosted Venezuela's health indicators to some of the highest levels in Latin America. The availability of low- or no-cost health care provided by the Venezuelan Institute of Social Security has also made Venezuela's health care infrastructure one of the more advanced in the region. However, despite being the most comprehensive and well funded in the region, the health care system has deteriorated sharply since the 1980s. Government expenditures on health care constituted an estimated 4.1 percent of gross domestic product in 2002. Total health expenditures per capita in 2001 totaled US$386. Per capita government expenditures on health in 2001 totaled US$240.

In April 2017 Venezuela's health ministry reported that maternal mortality jumped by 65% in 2016 and that the number of infant deaths rose by 30%. It also said that the number of cases of malaria was up by 76%. The ministry had not reported health data in two years. Venezuela is suffering from acute shortages of food and medicines.

== Asia ==
=== Afghanistan ===
The citizens of Afghanistan benefited from a well established free universal healthcare system until the arrival of the Mujahideen in 1992; which destroyed the health system of Afghanistan, forcing most medical professionals to leave the country and causing all medical training programs to cease. In 2004 Afghanistan had one medical facility for every 27,000 people, and some centers were responsible for as many as 300,000 people. In 2004 international organizations provided a large share of medical care. An estimated one-quarter of the population had no access to health care. In 2003 there were 11 physicians and 18 nurses per 100,000 population, and the per capita health expenditure was US$28.

=== Bhutan ===
Bhutan's health care system development accelerated in the early 1960s with the establishment of the Department of Public Health and the opening of new hospitals and dispensaries throughout the country. By the early 1990s, health care was provided through twenty-nine general hospitals (including five leprosy hospitals, three army hospitals, and one mobile hospital), forty-six dispensaries, sixty-seven basic health units, four indigenous-medicine dispensaries, and fifteen malaria eradication centers. The major hospitals were the National Referral Hospital in Thimphu, and other hospitals in Geylegphug, and Trashigang. Hospital beds in 1988 totaled 932. There was a severe shortage of health care personnel with official statistics reporting only 142 physicians and 678 paramedics, about one health care professional for every 2,000 people, or only one physician for almost 10,000 people. Training for health care assistants, nurses' aides, midwives, and primary health care workers was provided at the Royal Institute of Health Sciences, associated with Thimphu General Hospital, which was established in 1974. Graduates of the school were the core of the national public health system and helped staff the primary care basic health units throughout the country. Additional health care workers were recruited from among volunteers in villages to supplement primary health care. The Institute of Traditional Medicine Services supports indigenous medical centers associated with the district hospitals.

=== China ===
The effective public health work in controlling epidemic disease during the early years of China and, after reform began in 1978, the dramatic improvements in nutrition greatly improved the health and life expectancy of the Chinese people. The 2000 WHO World Health Report – Health systems: improving performance found that China's health care system before 1980 performed far better than countries at a comparable level of development, since 1980 ranks much lower than comparable countries. The famed "barefoot doctor" system was abolished in 1981.

China is undertaking a reform on its health care system. The New Rural Co-operative Medical Care System (NRCMCS) is a new 2005 initiative to overhaul the health care system, particularly intended to make it more affordable for the rural poor. Under the NRCMCS, the annual cost of medical cover is 50 yuan (US$7) per person. Of that, 20 yuan is paid in by the central government, 20 yuan by the provincial government and a contribution of 10 yuan is made by the patient. As of September 2007, around 80% of the whole rural population of China had signed up (about 685 million people). The system is tiered, depending on the location. If patients go to a small hospital or clinic in their local town, the scheme will cover from 70 to 80% of their bill. If they go to a county one, the percentage of the cost being covered falls to about 60%. And if they need specialist help in a large modern city hospital, they have to bear most of the cost themselves, the scheme would cover about 30% of the bill.

Health care was provided in both rural and urban areas through a three-tiered system. In rural areas the first tier was made up of barefoot doctors working out of village medical centers. They provided preventive and primary-care services, with an average of two doctors per 1,000 people. At the next level were the township health centers, which functioned primarily as out-patient clinics for about 10,000 to 30,000 people each. These centers had about ten to thirty beds each, and the most qualified members of the staff were assistant doctors. The two lower-level tiers made up the "rural collective health system" that provided most of the country's medical care. Only the most seriously ill patients were referred to the third and final tier, the county hospitals, which served 200,000 to 600,000 people each and were staffed by senior doctors who held degrees from 5-year medical schools. Health care in urban areas was provided by paramedical personnel assigned to factories and neighborhood health stations. If more professional care was necessary the patient was sent to a district hospital, and the most serious cases were handled by municipal hospitals. To ensure a higher level of care, a number of state enterprises and government agencies sent their employees directly to district or municipal hospitals, circumventing the paramedical, or barefoot doctor, stage.

=== India ===
In India, the hospitals and clinics are run by government, charitable trusts and by private organizations. The public clinics in rural areas are called Primary Health Centres (PHCs). Public hospitals are free for all and entirely funded through taxes. Major hospitals are located in district headquarters or major cities. At the federal level, a national health insurance program was launched in 2018 by the Government of India, called Ayushman Bharat. This aimed to cover the bottom 50% (500 million people) of the country's population working in the unorganized sector (enterprises having less than 10 employees) and offers them free treatment even at private hospitals. For people working in the organized sector (enterprises with more than 10 employees) and earning a monthly salary of up to Rs 21000 are covered by the social insurance scheme of Employees' State Insurance which entirely funds their healthcare (along with pension and unemployment benefits), both in public and private hospitals. People earning more than that amount are provided health insurance coverage by their employers through the many public or private insurance companies. As of 2020, 300 million Indians are covered by insurance bought from one of the public or private insurance companies by their employers as group or individual plans. Unemployed people without coverage are covered by the various state insurance schemes if they do not have the means to pay for it. In 2019, the total net government spending on healthcare was $36 billion or 1.23% of its GDP. Patients generally prefer private health clinics. These days some of the major corporate hospitals are attracting patients from neighboring countries such as Pakistan, countries in the Middle East and some European countries by providing quality treatment at low cost. In 2005, India spent 5% of GDP on health care, or US$36 per capita. Of that, approximately 19% was government expenditure.

=== Indonesia ===
Indonesia's community health system were organized in three tier, on top of the chart is Community Health Center (Puskesmas), followed by Health Sub-Center on the second level and Village-Level Integrated Post at the third level. According to data from the Ministry of Health of Indonesia there are 2454 hospitals around the country, with total of 305,242 bed counting 0.9 bed per 100,000 inhabitant. Among these 882 of these hospitals are government owned and 1509 are private hospitals. According to the Worldbank data in 2012, there are 0.2 physicians per 1,000 people, with 1.2 Nurses and Midwives per 1,000 people in Indonesia. Out of all the 2454 hospitals in Indonesia, 20 have been accredited by Joint Commission international (JCI) as of 2015. In addition there are 9718 government financed Puskesmas (Health Community Center) listed by the Ministry of Health of Indonesia, which provide comprehensive healthcare and vaccination for the population in the sub-district level. Both traditional and modern health practices are employed. A data taken from World Health Organization (WHO) of 2013 shows that government health expenditures are about 3.1 percent of the total gross domestic product (GDP).

=== Israel ===
In Israel, the publicly funded medical system is universal and compulsory. In 2005, Israel spent 7.8% of GDP on health care, or US$1,533 per capita. Of that, approximately 66% was government expenditure.

=== Japan ===
In Japan, services are provided either through regional/national public hospitals or through private hospitals/clinics, and patients have universal access to any facility, though hospitals tend to charge higher for those without a referral. Public health insurance covers most citizens/residents and pays 70% or more cost for each care and each prescribed drug. Patients are responsible for the remainder (upper limits apply). The monthly insurance premium is 0–50,000 JPY per household (scaled to annual income). Supplementary private health insurance is available only to cover the co-payments or non-covered costs, and usually makes a fixed payment per days in hospital or per surgery performed, rather than per actual expenditure. In 2005, Japan spent 8.2% of GDP on health care, or US$2,908 per capita. Of that, approximately 83% was government expenditure.

=== Jordan ===
In comparison to most of its neighbors, Jordan has quite an advanced health care system, although services remain highly concentrated in Amman. Government figures have put total health spending in 2002 at some 7.5 percent of Gross domestic product (GDP), while international health organizations place the figure even higher, at approximately 9.3 percent of GDP. The country's health care system is divided between public and private institutions. In the public sector, the Ministry of Health operates 1,245 primary health care centers and 27 hospitals, accounting for 37 percent of all hospital beds in the country; the military's Royal Medical Services runs 11 hospitals, providing 24 percent of all beds; and the Jordan University Hospital accounts for 3 percent of total beds in the country. The private sector provides 36 percent of all hospital beds, distributed among 56 hospitals. On 1 June 2007, Jordan Hospital (as the biggest private hospital) was the first general specialty hospital who gets the international accreditation (JCI). Treatment cost in Jordan hospitals is less than in other countries.

=== Kazakhstan ===
In principle, health care is paid for by the government. However, bribes often are necessary to obtain needed care. The quality of health care, which remained entirely under state control in 2006, has declined in the post-Soviet era because of insufficient funding and the loss of technical experts through emigration. Between 1989 and 2001, the ratio of doctors per 10,000 inhabitants fell by 15 percent, to 34.6, and the ratio of hospital beds per 10,000 inhabitants fell by 46 percent, to 74. By 2005 those indicators had recovered somewhat, to 55 and 77, respectively. Since 1991, health care has consistently lacked adequate government funding; in 2005 only 2.5 percent of gross domestic product went for that purpose. A government health reform program aims to increase that figure to 4 percent in 2010. A compulsory health insurance system has been in the planning stages for several years. Wages for health workers are extremely low, and equipment is in critically short supply. The main foreign source of medical equipment is Japan. Because of cost, the emphasis of treatment increasingly is on outpatient care instead of the hospital care preferred under the Soviet system. The health system is in crisis in rural areas such as the Aral Sea region, where health is most affected by pollution.

=== Malaysia ===
Health care in Malaysia is divided into private and public sectors. Doctors are required to undergo a 2-year internship and perform 3 years of service with public hospitals throughout the nation, ensuring adequate coverage of medical needs for the general population. Foreign doctors are encouraged to apply for employment in Malaysia, especially if they are qualified to a higher level.

Malaysian society places importance on the expansion and development of health care, putting 5% of the government social sector development budget into public health care – an increase of more than 47% over the previous figure. This has meant an overall increase of more than RM 2 billion. With a rising and ageing population, the government wishes to improve in many areas including the refurbishment of existing hospitals, building and equipping new hospitals, expansion of the number of polyclinics, and improvements in training and expansion of telehealth. Over the last couple of years they have increased their efforts to overhaul the systems and attract more foreign investment.

There is still a shortage in the medical workforce, especially of highly trained specialists. As a result, certain medical care and treatment is available only in large cities. Recent efforts to bring many facilities to other towns have been hampered by lack of expertise to run the available equipment made ready by investments.

The majority of private hospital facilities are in urban areas and, unlike many of the public hospitals, are equipped with the latest diagnostic and imaging facilities.

=== North Korea ===
North Korea has a national medical service and health insurance system. As of 2000, some 99 percent of the population had access to sanitation, and 100 percent had access to water, but water was not always potable. Medical treatment is paid for by the state. In the past, there reportedly has been one doctor for every 700 inhabitants and one hospital bed for every 350 inhabitants. Health expenditures in 2001 were 2.5 percent of gross domestic product, and 73 percent of health expenditures were made in the public sector. There were no reported human immuno-deficiency virus/acquired immune deficiency syndrome (HIV/AIDS) cases as of 2007. However, it is estimated that between 500,000 and 3 million people died from famine in the 1990s, and a 1998 United Nations (UN) World Food Programme report revealed that 60 percent of children suffered from malnutrition, and 16 percent were acutely malnourished. UN statistics for the period 1999–2001 reveal that North Korea's daily per capita food supply was one of the lowest in Asia, exceeding only that of Cambodia, Laos, and Tajikistan, and one of the lowest worldwide. Because of continuing economic problems, food shortages and chronic malnutrition prevail in the 2000s.

=== Oman ===
Oman's healthcare system was ranked at number 8 by the WHO health systems ranking in 2000. Universal healthcare (including prescriptions and dental care) is provided automatically to all citizens and also to expatriates working in the public sector by the Ministry of Health. Non-eligible individuals such as expatriates working in the private sector and foreign visitors can be treated in the government hospitals and clinics for a reasonable fee or they can opt for the more expensive private clinics and medical centres. The Ministry of Health also finances the treatment of citizens abroad if the required treatment is not available in Oman. The life expectancy in Oman as of 2007 was 71.6. It had 1.81 doctors per 1000 pop., 1.9 beds per 1000 pop. and an infant mortality rate of 9 per 1000 live births. Health expenditure accounts for 4.5% of government revenue.

=== Pakistan ===
Pakistan's health indicators, health funding, and health and sanitation infrastructure are generally poor, particularly in rural areas. About 19 percent of the population is malnourished – a higher rate than the 17 percent average for developing countries – and 30 percent of children under age five are malnourished. Leading causes of sickness and death include gastroenteritis, respiratory infections, congenital abnormalities, tuberculosis, malaria, and typhoid fever. The United Nations estimates that in 2003 Pakistan's human immunodeficiency virus (HIV) prevalence rate was 0.1 percent among those 15–49, with an estimated 4,900 deaths from acquired immune deficiency syndrome (AIDS). AIDS is a major health concern, and both the government and religious community are engaging in efforts to reduce its spread. In 2003 there were 68 physicians for every 100,000 persons in Pakistan. According to 2002 government statistics, there were 12,501 health institutions nationwide, including 4,590 dispensaries, 906 hospitals with a total of 80,665 hospital beds, and 550 rural health centers with a total of 8,840 beds. According to the World Health Organization, Pakistan's total health expenditures amounted to 3.9 percent of gross domestic product (GDP) in 2001, and per capita health expenditures were US$16. The government provided 24.4 percent of total health expenditures, with the remainder being entirely private, out-of-pocket expenses.

=== Philippines ===
Since 1995, PhilHealth has aimed for universal healthcare coverage through a governmental health insurance scheme. In 2000 the Philippines had about 95,000 physicians, or about 1 per 800 people. In 2001 there were about 1,700 hospitals, of which about 40 percent were government-run and 60 percent private, with a total of about 85,000 beds, or about one bed per 900 people. The leading causes of morbidity as of 2002 were diarrhea, bronchitis, pneumonia, influenza, hypertension, tuberculosis, heart disease, malaria, chickenpox, and measles. Cardiovascular diseases account for more than 25 percent of all deaths. According to official estimates, 1,965 cases of human immunodeficiency virus (HIV) were reported in 2003, of which 636 had developed acquired immune deficiency syndrome (AIDS). Other estimates state that there may have been as many as 9,400 people living with HIV/AIDS in 2001.

=== Singapore ===
Health care in Singapore is mainly under the responsibility of the Singapore Government's Ministry of Health. Singapore generally has an efficient and widespread system of health care. It implements a universal health care system, and co-exists with private health care system. Infant mortality rate: in 2006 the crude birth rate stood at 10.1 per 1000, and the crude death rate was also one of the lowest in the world at 4.3 per 1000. In 2006, the total fertility rate was only 1.26 children per woman, the 3rd lowest in the world and well below the 2.10 needed to replace the population. Singapore was ranked 6th in the World Health Organization's ranking of the world's health systems in the year 2000.

Singapore has a universal health care system where government ensures affordability, largely through compulsory savings and price controls, while the private sector provides most care. Overall spending on health care amounts to only 3% of annual GDP. Of that, 66% comes from private sources. Singapore currently has the lowest infant mortality rate in the world (equaled only by Iceland) and among the highest life expectancies from birth, according to the World Health Organization. Singapore has "one of the most successful health care systems in the world, in terms of both efficiency in financing and the results achieved in community health outcomes," according to an analysis by global consulting firm Watson Wyatt. Singapore's system uses a combination of compulsory savings from payroll deductions (funded by both employers and workers) a nationalized catastrophic health insurance plan, and government subsidies, as well as "actively regulating the supply and prices of health care services in the country" to keep costs in check; the specific features have been described as potentially a "very difficult system to replicate in many other countries." Many Singaporeans also have supplemental private health insurance (often provided by employers) for services not covered by the government's programs.

Singapore's health care system comprises a total of 13 private hospitals, 10 public (government) hospitals and several specialist clinics, each specializing in and catering to different patient needs, at varying costs.

Patients are free to choose the providers within the government or private health care delivery system and can walk in for a consultation at any private clinic or any government polyclinic. For emergency services, patients can go at any time to the 24-hour Accident & Emergency Departments located in the government hospitals.

Singapore has medical savings account system known as Medisave.

=== South Korea ===
Healthcare in South Korea is universal, although a significant portion of healthcare is privately funded. South Korea's healthcare system is based on the National Health Insurance Service, a public health insurance program run by the Ministry of Health and Welfare to which South Koreans of sufficient income must pay contributions to in order to insure themselves and their dependants, and the Medical Aid Program, a social welfare program run by the central government and local governments to insure those unable to pay National Health Insurance contributions. In 2015, South Korea ranked first in the OECD for healthcare access. Satisfaction of healthcare has been consistently among the highest in the world – South Korea was rated as the second most efficient healthcare system by Bloomberg.

=== Syria ===
The Syrian Ba'ath Party has placed an emphasis on health care, but funding levels have not been able to keep up with demand or maintain quality. Health expenditures reportedly accounted for 2.5 percent of the gross domestic product (GDP) in 2001. Syria's health system is relatively decentralized and focuses on offering primary health care at three levels: village, district, and provincial. According to the World Health Organization (WHO), in 1990 Syria had 41 general hospitals (33 public, 8 private), 152 specialized hospitals (16 public, 136 private), 391 rural health centers, 151 urban health centers, 79 rural health units, and 49 specialized health centers; hospital beds totaled 13,164 (77 percent public, 23 percent private), or 11 beds per 10,000 inhabitants. The number of state hospital beds reportedly fell between 1995 and 2001, while the population had an 18 percent increase, but the opening of new hospitals in 2002 caused the number of hospital beds to double. WHO reported that in 1989 Syria had a total of 10,114 physicians, 3,362 dentists, and 14,816 nurses and midwives; in 1995 the rate of health professionals per 10,000 inhabitants was 10.9 physicians, 5.6 dentists, and 21.2 nurses and midwives. Despite overall improvements, Syria's health system exhibits significant regional disparities in the availability of health care, especially between urban and rural areas. The number of private hospitals and doctors increased by 41 percent between 1995 and 2001 as a result of growing demand and growing wealth in a small sector of society. Almost all private health facilities are located in large urban areas such as Damascus, Aleppo, Tartus, and Latakia.

=== Taiwan ===
The current health care system in Taiwan, known as National Health Insurance (NHI), was instituted in 1995. NHI is a single-payer compulsory social insurance plan which centralizes the disbursement of health care dollars. The system promises equal access to health care for all citizens, and the population coverage had reached 99% by the end of 2004. NHI is mainly financed through premiums, which are based on the payroll tax, and is supplemented with out-of-pocket payments and direct government funding. In the initial stage, fee-for-service predominated for both public and private providers. Most health providers operate in the private sector and form a competitive market on the health delivery side. However, many health care providers took advantage of the system by offering unnecessary services to a larger number of patients and then billing the government. In the face of increasing loss and the need for cost containment, NHI changed the payment system from fee-for-service to a global budget, a kind of prospective payment system, in 2002.According to the Numbeo Health Care Index in 2025, Taiwan has the best healthcare system in the world, scoring 86.5 out of 100

According to T.R. Reid, Taiwan achieves "remarkable efficiency", costing ≈6 percent of GDP universal coverage; however, this underestimates the cost as it is not fully funded and the government is forced to borrow to make up the difference. "And frankly, the solution is fairly obvious: increase the spending a little, to maybe 8 percent of GDP. Of course, if Taiwan did that, it would still be spending less than half of what America spends."

=== Thailand ===
The majority of health care services in Thailand is delivered by the public sector, which includes 1,002 hospitals and 9,765 health stations. Universal health care is provided through three programs: the civil service welfare system for civil servants and their families, Social Security for private employees, and the Universal Coverage scheme theoretically available to all other Thai nationals. Some private hospitals are participants in these programs, though most are financed by patient self-payment and private insurance.

The Ministry of Public Health (MOPH) oversees national health policy and also operates most government health facilities. The National Health Security Office (NHSO) allocates funding through the Universal Coverage program. Other health-related government agencies include the Health System Research Institute (HSRI), Thai Health Promotion Foundation ("ThaiHealth"), National Health Commission Office (NHCO), and the Emergency Medical Institute of Thailand (EMIT). Although there have been national policies for decentralization, there has been resistance in implementing such changes and the MOPH still directly controls most aspects of health care.

=== Turkmenistan ===
In the post-Soviet era, reduced funding has put the health system in poor condition. In 2002 Turkmenistan had 50 hospital beds per 10,000 population, less than half the number in 1996. Overall policy has targeted specialized inpatient facilities to the detriment of basic, outpatient care. Since the late 1990s, many rural facilities have closed, making care available principally in urban areas. President Niyazov's 2005 proposal to close all hospitals outside Ashgabat intensified this trend. Physicians are poorly trained, modern medical techniques are rarely used, and medications are in short supply. In 2004 Niyazov dismissed 15,000 medical professionals, exacerbating the shortage of personnel. In some cases, professionals have been replaced by military conscripts. Private health care is rare, as the state maintains a near monopoly and most people are too poor to afford it. Government-paid public health care that it inherited from the Soviet Union was abolished in 2004.

=== United Arab Emirates ===
Standards of health care are considered to be generally high in the United Arab Emirates, resulting from increased government spending during strong economic years. According to the UAE government, total expenditures on health care from 1996 to 2003 were US$436 million. According to the World Health Organization, in 2004 total expenditures on health care constituted 2.9 percent of gross domestic product (GDP), and the per capita expenditure for health care was US$497. Health care currently is government-paid only for UAE citizens. Effective January 2006, all residents of Abu Dhabi are covered by a new comprehensive health insurance program; costs will be shared between employers and employees. The number of doctors per 100,000 (annual average, 1990–99) is 181. The UAE now has 40 public hospitals, compared with only seven in 1970. The Ministry of Health is undertaking a multimillion-dollar program to expand health facilities – hospitals, medical centers, and a trauma center – in the seven emirates. A state-of-the-art general hospital has opened in Abu Dhabi with a projected bed capacity of 143, a trauma unit, and the first home health care program in the UAE. To attract wealthy UAE nationals and expatriates who traditionally have traveled abroad for serious medical care, Dubai is developing Dubai Healthcare City, a hospital free zone that will offer international-standard advanced private health care and provide an academic medical training center; completion is scheduled for 2010.

=== Uzbekistan ===
In the post-Soviet era, the quality of Uzbekistan's health care has declined. Between 1992 and 2003, spending on health care and the ratio of hospital beds to population both decreased by nearly 50 percent, and Russian emigration in that decade deprived the health system of many practitioners. In 2004 Uzbekistan had 53 hospital beds per 10,000 population. Basic medical supplies such as disposable needles, anesthetics, and antibiotics are in very short supply. Although all citizens nominally are entitled to free health care, in the post-Soviet era bribery has become a common way to bypass the slow and limited service of the state system. In the early 2000s, policy has focused on improving primary health care facilities and cutting the cost of inpatient facilities. The state budget for 2006 allotted 11.1 percent to health expenditures, compared with 10.9 percent in 2005.

=== Vietnam ===
The overall quality of health in Vietnam is regarded as good, as reflected by 2005 estimates of life expectancy (70.61 years) and infant mortality (25.95 per 1,000 live births). However, malnutrition is still common in the provinces, and the life expectancy and infant mortality rates are stagnating. In 2001 government spending on health care corresponded to just 0.9 percent of gross domestic product (GDP). Government subsidies covered only about 20 percent of health care expenses, with the remaining 80 percent coming out of individuals' own pockets.

In 1954 the government in the North established a public health system that reached down to the hamlet level. After reunification in 1976, this system was extended to the South. Beginning in the late 1980s, the quality of health care began to decline as a result of budgetary constraints, a shift of responsibility to the provinces, and the introduction of charges. Inadequate funding has led to delays in planned upgrades to water supply and sewage systems. As a result, almost half the population has no access to clean water, a deficiency that promotes such infectious diseases as malaria, dengue fever, typhoid, and cholera. Inadequate funding also has contributed to a shortage of nurses, midwives, and hospital beds. In 2000 Vietnam had only 250,000 hospital beds, or 14.8 beds per 10,000 people, a very low ratio among Asian nations, according to the World Bank.

Since the early 2020s, Vietnam's healthcare sector has attracted increasing foreign investment, driven by rising healthcare expenditure, population ageing, the expansion of the middle class, and growing demand for private healthcare services. Private hospitals, specialist clinics, and pharmacy chains have become major targets for mergers and acquisitions by international investors, reflecting expectations of sustained growth in the country's healthcare market. According to senior healthcare executive Tran Quoc Bao, who has served as CEO of Prima Saigon Hospital, Hoan My International Eye Hospital, and City International Hospital, these demographic and economic trends, coupled with government policies promoting private-sector participation, have created significant opportunities for private healthcare investment., have increased Vietnam's attractiveness as a regional healthcare investment destination.

=== Yemen ===
Despite the significant progress Yemen has made to expand and improve its health care system over the past decade, the system remains severely underdeveloped. Total expenditures on health care in 2002 constituted 3.7 percent of gross domestic product. In that same year, the per capita expenditure for health care was very low, as compared with other Middle Eastern countries – US$58 according to United Nations statistics and US$23 according to the World Health Organization. According to the World Bank, the number of doctors in Yemen rose by an average of more than 7 percent between 1995 and 2000, but as of 2004 there were still only three doctors per 10,000 persons. In 2003 Yemen had only 0.6 hospital beds available per 1,000 persons. Health care services are particularly scarce in rural areas; only 25 percent of rural areas are covered by health services, as compared with 80 percent of urban areas. Emergency services, such as ambulance service and blood banks, are non-existent. Most childhood deaths are caused by illnesses for which vaccines exist or that are otherwise preventable. According to the Joint United Nations Programme on HIV/AIDS, in 2003 an estimated 12,000 people in Yemen were living with human immunodeficiency virus/acquired immune deficiency syndrome (HIV/AIDS).

== Europe ==
=== Spending ===
Expand the OECD charts below to see the breakdown:

- "Government/compulsory": Government spending and compulsory health insurance.
- "Voluntary": Voluntary health insurance and private funds such as households' out-of-pocket payments, NGOs and private corporations.
- They are represented by columns starting at zero. They are not stacked. The 2 are combined to get the total.
- At the source you can run your cursor over the columns to get the year and the total for that country.
- Click the table tab at the source to get 3 lists (one after another) of amounts by country: "Total", "Government/compulsory", and "Voluntary".

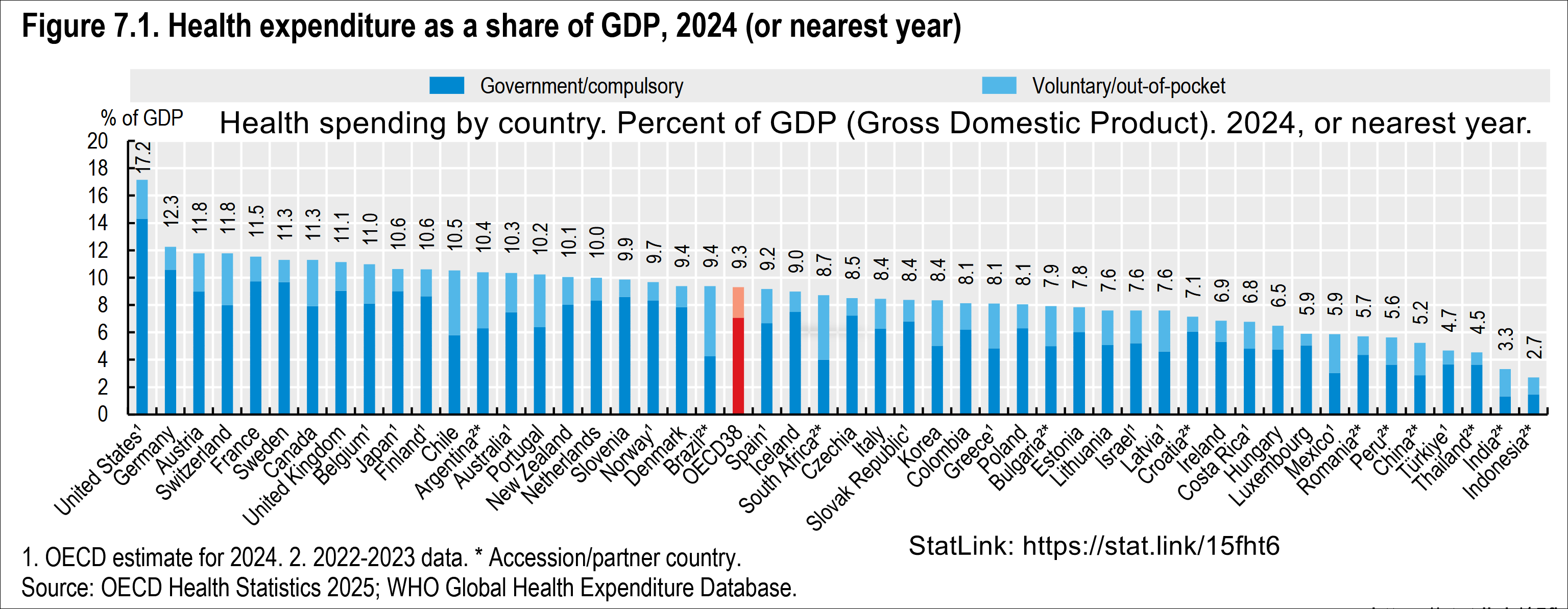
Health spending by country. Percent of GDP (Gross domestic product). For example: 11.2% for Canada in 2022. 16.6% for the United States in 2022.

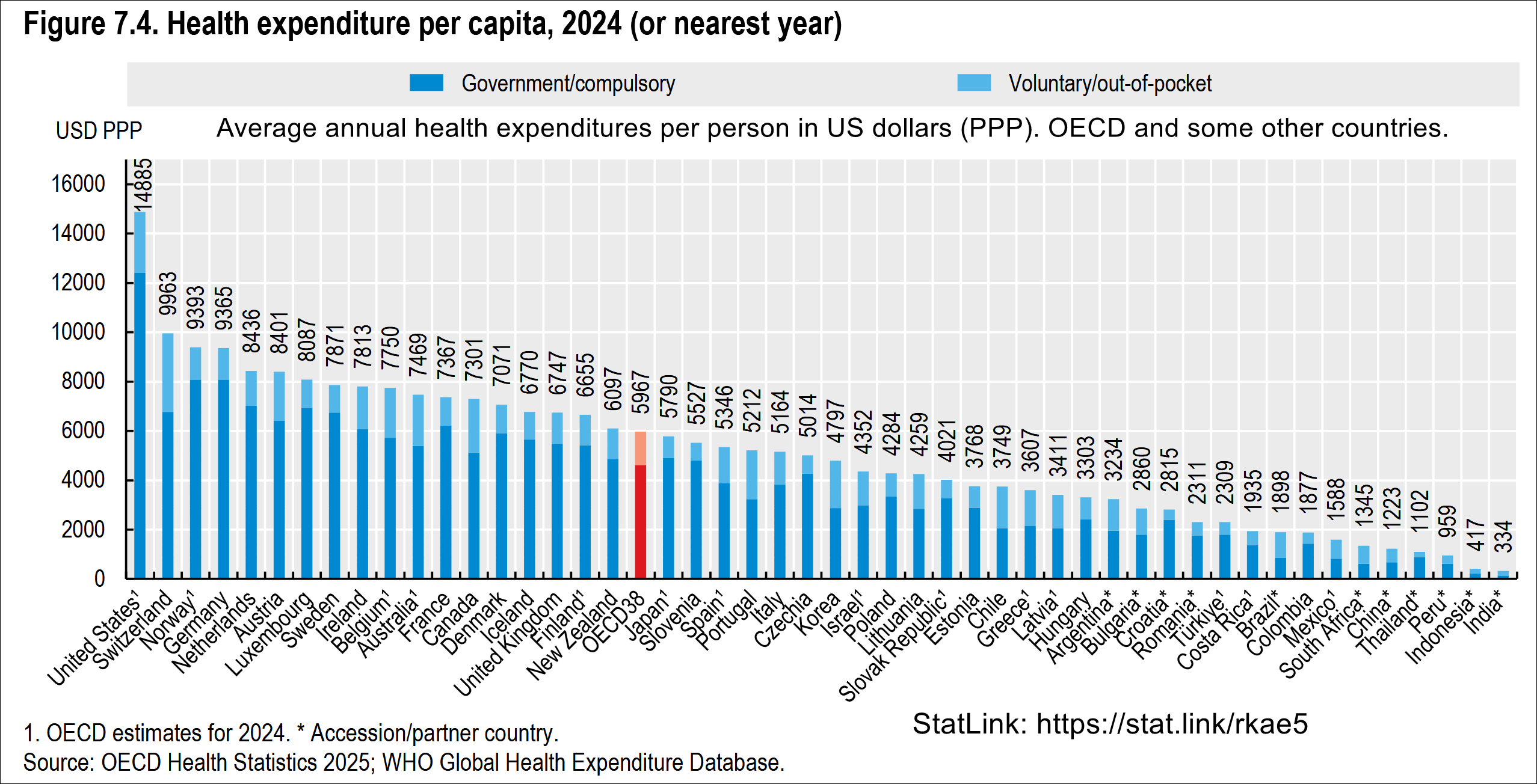
Total healthcare cost per person. Public and private spending. US dollars PPP. For example: $6,319 for Canada in 2022. $12,555 for the US in 2022.

=== Belgium ===
As in most countries, the Belgian system divides itself into state and private, though fees are payable in both. A person must have adequate coverage through either the state or private insurance. In the state mutuelle/mutualiteit scheme a person has the ability to choose any doctor, clinic or hospital in any location without referral, according to the patient's needs in much the same way as with private insurance.

General practitioners can be found in private practices or attached to clinics and hospitals. A person is free to consult or register with any of their own choosing. Similarly with specialist consultants. Reimbursements are available for those with insurance, either private or public. If a patient is on a private scheme, or is uninsured, the fee is payable in full at the time of the appointment. The patient then brings, mails or deposits the receipt to his insurance mutuality which then immediately repays the amount. The majority of dentists in Belgium are private, though there are those who accept part-payment on state insurance. As with general practitioners, patients can arrange to see a specialist of their choice at any hospital. Those going into hospital for a planned stay need to take personal care items (such as a towel, soap etc.) with them. In Brussels, the eleven big public hospitals are organized under the Iris association.

The Ministry of Health recognizes homeopathy, acupuncture, osteopathy and chiropractic as reimbursable alternative treatments. Reimbursement is possible only if the practitioner is registered as a qualified doctor. If a call is made to the Emergency services using the old emergency number (100) or the European telephone number (112), an ambulance will transport the patient to the nearest hospital or the best centre suited according to the needs of the patient, for example, a Specialist Burns Unit. Pharmacies are common in Belgium and are marked with a green cross on the street. There is a rota system for pharmacists to open outside of usual hours through the night.

Health care insurance is a part of the Belgian social security system. To enrol, a person must first join a health insurance fund mutuelle (mutualité) or ziekenfonds (mutualiteit) for which an employer's certificate is required if the employer is to contribute to the cost. If employed a person's contributions is automatically deducted from salary. The employer will also pay a contribution. Health insurance funds will reimburse medical costs. The choice of mutual insurer is up to the individual. Most of them are affiliated to a religious or political institution but there is no real difference between them because reimbursement rates are fixed by the Belgian government.

Insurance funds do not always cover the full costs of treatment and typical reimbursement is between half to three-quarters of a typical doctors or specialists visit. A deciding factor here depends on one's job. From people who are unemployed or disabled, receiving other benefits or business-owners receive somewhat less. There is also a "yearly maximum bill" meaning that someone who has paid a certain amount to their doctor/hospital within the year does not have to make any further payment. From this point, any extra is returned from the patient's insurance. In general, the poor, even without reaching the necessary sum, do not pay anything.

=== Bulgaria ===
Bulgaria began overall reform of its antiquated health system, inherited from the communist era, only in 1999. In the 1990s, private medical practices expanded somewhat, but most Bulgarians relied on communist-era public clinics while paying high prices for special care. During that period, national health indicators generally worsened as economic crises substantially decreased health funding. The subsequent health reform program has introduced mandatory employee health insurance through the National Health Insurance Fund (NHIF), which since 2000 has paid a gradually increasing portion of primary health care costs. Employees and employers pay an increasing, mandatory percentage of salaries, with the goal of gradually reducing state support of health care. Private health insurance plays only a supplementary role. The system also has been decentralized by making municipalities responsible for their own health care facilities, and by 2005 most primary care came from private physicians. Pharmaceutical distribution also was decentralized.

In the early 2000s, the hospital system was reduced substantially to limit reliance on hospitals for routine care. Anticipated membership in the European Union (2007) was a major motivation for this trend. Between 2002 and 2003, the number of hospital beds was reduced by 56 percent to 24,300. However, the pace of reduction slowed in the early 2000s; in 2004 some 258 hospitals were in operation, compared with the estimated optimal number of 140. Between 2002 and 2004, health care expenditures in the national budget increased from 3.8 percent to 4.3 percent, with the NHIF accounting for more than 60 percent of annual expenditures.

In the 1990s, the quality of medical research and training decreased seriously because of low funding. In the early 2000s, the emphasis of medical and paramedical training, which was conducted in five medical schools, was preparation of primary-care personnel to overcome shortages resulting from the communist system's long-term emphasis on training specialists. Experts considered that Bulgaria had an adequate supply of doctors but a shortage of other medical personnel. In 2000 Bulgaria had 3.4 doctors, 3.9 nurses, and 0.5 midwives per 1,000 population.

=== Denmark ===
Denmark's health care system has retained the same basic structure since the early 1970s. The administration of hospitals and personnel is dealt with by the Ministry of the Interior, while primary care facilities, health insurance, and community care are the responsibility of the Ministry of Social Affairs. Anyone can go to a physician for no fee and the public health system entitles each Dane to his/her own doctor. Expert medical/surgical aid is available, with a qualified nursing staff. Costs are borne by public authorities, but high taxes contribute to these costs. As of 1999, there were an estimated 3.4 physicians and 4.5 hospital beds per 1,000 people. The number of hospital beds, like that in other EU countries, has undergone a major decline since 1980, from around 40,000 to about 23,000 in 1998/99. Deinstitutionalization of psychiatric patients has contributed significantly to this trend. The ratio of doctors to population, by contrast, has increased during this period.

The total fertility rate in 2000 was 1.7, while the maternal mortality rate was 10 per 100,000 live births as of 1998. Studies show that between 1980 and 1993, 63% of married women (ages 15 to 49) used contraception. As of 2002 cardiovascular diseases and cancer were the leading causes of death. Denmark's cancer rates were the highest in the European Union. In 1999, there were only 12 reported cases of tuberculosis per 100,000 people. As of 1999, the number of people living with HIV/AIDS was estimated at 4,300 and deaths from AIDS that year were estimated at less than 100. HIV prevalence was 0.17 per 100 adults.

Danish citizens may choose between two systems of primary health care: medical care paid for by the government provided by a doctor whom the individual chooses for a year and by those specialists to whom the doctor refers the patient; or complete freedom of choice of any physician or specialist at any time, with state reimbursement of about two-thirds of the cost for medical bills paid directly by the patient. Most Danes opt for the former. All patients receive subsidies on pharmaceuticals and vital drugs; everyone must pay a share of dental bills. As of 1999, total health care expenditure was estimated at 8.4% of GDP.

Responsibility for the public hospital service rests with county authorities. Counties form public hospital regions, each of which is allotted one or two larger hospitals with specialists and two to four smaller hospitals where medical treatment is practically totally paid for by the government. State-appointed medical health officers, responsible to the National Board of Health, are employed to advise local governments on health matters. Public health authorities have waged large-scale campaigns against tuberculosis, venereal diseases, diphtheria, and poliomyelitis. The government-paid guidance and assistance given to mothers of newborn children by public health nurses have resulted in a low infant mortality rate of 4 per 1,000 live births (2000). Medical treatment is government-paid up to school age, when government-paid school medical inspections begin. As of 1999, children up to one year of age were vaccinated against diphtheria, pertussis, and tetanus (99%) and measles (92%). In 2000, life expectancy at birth was 76 years for males and females. The overall death rate was 11 per 1,000 people in 1999.

=== Estonia ===
Healthcare in Estonia is supervised by the Ministry of Social Affairs and funded by general taxation through the National Health Service.

=== Finland ===
In Finland, public medical services at clinics and hospitals are run by the municipalities (local government) and are funded 78% by taxation, 20% by patients through access charges, and by others 2%. Patient access charges are subject to annual caps. For example, GP visits are (€11 per visit with annual €33 cap), hospital outpatient treatment (€22 per visit), a hospital stay, including food, medical care and medicines (€26 per 24 hours, or €12 if in a psychiatric hospital). After a patient has spent €590 per year on public medical services, all treatment and medications thereafter are paid for by the government. Taxation funding is partly local and partly nationally based. Patients can claim re-imbursement of part of their prescription costs from KELA. Finland also has a much smaller private medical sector which accounts for about 14 percent of total health care spending. Only 8% of doctors choose to work in private practice, and some of these also choose to do some work in the public sector. Private sector patients can claim a contribution from KELA towards their private medical costs (including dentistry) if they choose to be treated in the more expensive private sector, or they can join private insurance funds. However, private sector health care is mainly in the primary care sector. There are virtually no private hospitals, the main hospitals being either municipally owned (funded from local taxes) or run by the teaching universities (funded jointly by the municipalities and the national government). In 2005, Finland spent 7.5% of GDP on health care, or US$2,824 per capita. Of that, approximately 78% was government expenditure.

=== France ===
In its 2000 assessment of world health systems, the World Health Organization found that France provided the "best overall health care" in the world. In 2005, France spent 11.2% of GDP on health care, or US$3,926 per capita. Of that, approximately 80% was government expenditure.

In France, most doctors remain in private practice; there are both private and public hospitals. Social Security consists of several public organizations, distinct from the state government, with separate budgets that refunds patients for care in both private and public facilities. It generally refunds patients 70% of most health care costs, and 100% in case of costly or long-term ailments. Supplemental coverage may be bought from private insurers, most of them nonprofit, mutual insurers, to the point that the word "mutuelle" (mutual) has come to be a synonym of supplemental private insurer in common language.

Until recently, social security coverage was restricted to those who contributed to social security (generally, workers, unemployed or retirees), excluding some few poor segments of the population; the government of Lionel Jospin put into place the "universal health coverage" allowing the entire French population to benefit from Health care. In some systems, patients can also take private health insurance but choose to receive care at public hospitals, if allowed by the private insurer. For serious illness, regardless of the insurance regime, the national health system will assume the cost of long-term remedial treatment.

=== Germany ===
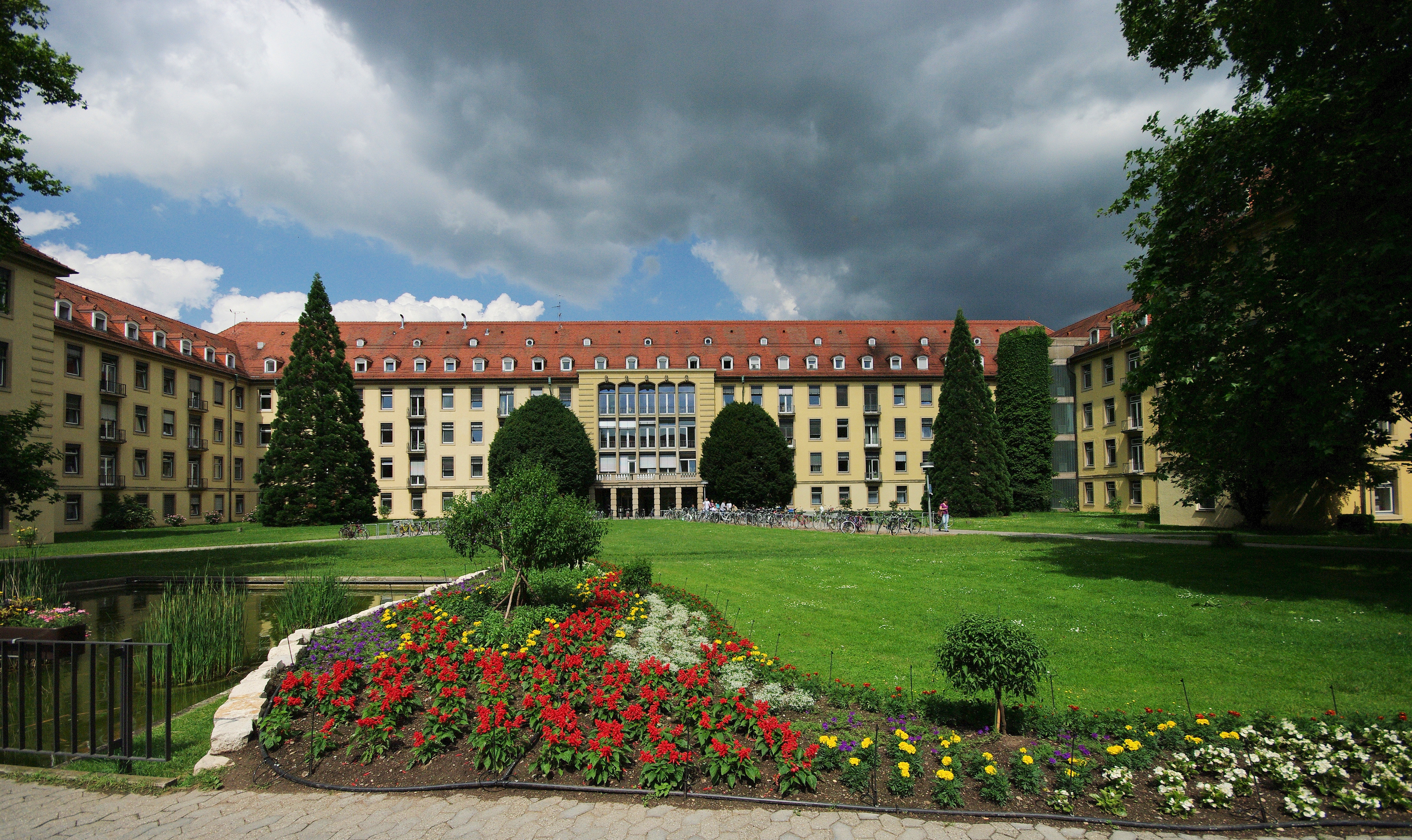
The University Medical Center Freiburg in Germany

Germany has a universal multi-payer system with two main types of health insurance: statutory health insurance (Gesetzliche Krankenversicherung – GKV) and private health insurance (Private Krankenversicherung – PKV). All German residents are legally required to have health insurance. Employees whose gross income is below a fixed threshold (Versicherungspflichtgrenze) are compulsorily insured within the GKV system. Those earning above this threshold, as well as freelancers and civil servants, can choose to be voluntarily insured (freiwillig versichert) within the GKV or opt for PKV.

For employees, contributions are generally shared equally between the employer and the employee, whereas self-employed individuals must typically bear the full cost themselves. Provider compensation rates are negotiated through corporatist social bargaining between physicians' associations and health insurance funds at the state level. While GKV coverage is strictly regulated and standardized, private supplementary insurance is available to cover additional services.

In 2024, total health expenditure in Germany rose to €538.2 billion, representing 12.4% of the gross domestic product (GDP). The financing is primarily provided by the statutory health insurance (GKV) with €300.8 billion, followed by social long-term care insurance (€64.7 billion), private households (€65.0 billion), and private health insurance (€44.8 billion).

=== Greece ===
The Greek healthcare system is universal and is ranked as one of the best in the world. In a 2000 World Health Organization report it was ranked 14th in the overall assessment and 11th at quality of service, surpassing countries such as the United Kingdom (18th) and Germany (25th). In 2010 there were 131 hospitals with 35,000 beds in the country, but on 1 July 2011 the Ministry for Health and Social Solidarity announced its proposal to shorten the number to 83 hospitals with 33,000 beds. Greece's healthcare expenditures as a percentage of GDP were 9.6% in 2007 according to a 2011 OECD report, just above the OECD average of 9.5%. The country has the largest number of doctors-to-population ratio of any OECD country. Life expectancy in Greece is 80.3 years, above the OECD average of 79.5. and among the highest in the world. The same OECD report showed that Greece had the largest percentage of adult daily smokers of any of the 34 OECD members. The country's obesity rate is 18.1%, which is above the OECD average of 15.1% but considerably below the American rate of 27.7%. In 2008 Greece had the highest rate of perceived good health in the OECD, at 98.5%. Infant mortality is one of the lowest in the developed world with a rate of 3.1 deaths/1000 live births.

=== Iceland ===
Healthcare in Iceland is universal. The healthcare system is largely paid for by taxes (85%) and to some extent by service fees (15%) and is administrated by the Ministry of Welfare. A considerable portion of government spending is assigned to healthcare. There is almost no private health insurance in Iceland and no private hospitals.

=== Ireland ===
All persons resident in Ireland are entitled to health care through the public health care system, which is managed by the Health Service Executive and funded by general taxation. A person may be required to pay a subsidised fee for certain health care received; this depends on income, age, illness or disability. All maternity services are however paid for by the government, as well as health care of children under 8 years of age. Emergency care is provided at a cost of €100 for a visit to a hospital Emergency Department.

However, the poor quality of public healthcare has led to a large reliance on private health insurance; over 45% of Irish citizens have private cover. The Irish healthcare system is often described as being "two-tier" or having a "public–private mix." A proposed reform, known as Sláintecare, is being planned; it would provide universal healthcare on the model of the British NHS or other European systems.

=== Italy ===
According to WHO in 2000, Italy had the world's "second overall best" healthcare system in the world, coming after France, and surpassing Spain, Oman and Japan.

In 1978 Italy adopted a tax-funded universal health care system called "National Health Service" (in Italian: Servizio Sanitario Nazionale), which was closely modeled on the British system. The SSN covers general practice (distinct between adult and pediatric practice), outpatient and inpatient treatments, and the cost of most (but not all) drugs and sanitary ware. The government sets LEA (fundamental levels of care, Livelli essenziali di assistenza in Italian) which cover all necessary treatments, which the state must guarantee to all, paid for by the government, or for a "ticket", a share of the costs (but various categories are exempted). The public system has also the duty of prevention at place of work and in the general environment. A private sector also exists, with a minority role in medicine but a principal role in dental health, as most people prefer private dental services.

In Italy the public system has the unique feature of paying general practitioners a fee per capita per year, a salary system, that does not reward repeat visits, testing, and referrals. While there is a paucity of nurses, Italy has one of the highest doctor per capita ratios at 3.9 doctors per 1,000 patients. In 2005, Italy spent 8.9% of GDP on health care, or US$2,714 per capita. Of that, approximately 76% was government expenditure.

=== Netherlands ===
Health care in the Netherlands, has since January 2006 been provided by a system of compulsory insurance backed by a risk equalization program so that the insured are not penalized for their age or health status. This is meant to encourage competition between health care providers and insurers. Children under 18 are insured by the government, and special assistance is available to those with limited incomes. In 2005, the Netherlands spent 9.2% of GDP on health care, or US$3,560 per capita. Of that, approximately 65% was government expenditure.

=== Norway ===
Norway has a government run and government financed universal health care system, covering physical and mental health for all and dental health for children under the age of 16. Hospitals are paid by the state and doctor visit fees are capped at a fairly low rate. Short-term prescriptions for medication are market price, but long-term prescriptions, defined as more than three months a year, are eligible for a large discount. In addition, a yearly cap applies for people with high medical expenses.

Some health care is private. For example, most adults use private dental care, whereas the public system only treats people, for a normal fee, when they have free capacity. Health-related plastic surgery (like burn damage) is covered by the public system, while cosmetic surgery in general is private. There are a number of private psychologists, there are also some private general practice doctors and specialists.

Public health care is financed by a special-purpose income tax on the order of 8–11%, loosely translated as "public benefits fee" (Norwegian: "trygdeavgift og Folketrygden"). This can be considered a mandatory public insurance, covering not only health care but also loss of income during sick leave, public pension, unemployment benefits, benefits for single parents and a few others. The system is supposed to be self-financing from the taxes.

Norwegian citizens living in Norway are automatically covered, even if they never had taxable income. Norwegian citizens living and working abroad (taxable elsewhere and therefore not paying the "public benefits fee" to Norway) are covered for up to one year after they move abroad, and must pay an estimated market cost for public health care services. Non-citizens such as foreign visitors are covered in full.

According to WHO, total health care expenditure in 2005 was 9% of GDP and paid 84% by government, 15% by private out-of-pocket and ≈1% by other private sources.

=== Poland ===
In Poland, healthcare is delivered through a publicly funded healthcare system enshrined in Article 68 of the Constitution of Poland. Employers contribute ~1750PLN per month per employee, people collecting unemployment are covered, and self employed people are compelled to pay either a temporarily lowered or the full 1750PLN rate. Poland's expenditure on healthcare was 6.7% of GDP in 2012 or $900 per capita. The public spending rate for Poland in 2012 was 72% – in-line with the OECD average. A number of private medical complexes also complement public healthcare institutions nationwide.

=== Romania ===
Health care public system has been improved but it is still poor by European standards, and access is limited in rural areas. In 2007 health expenditures were equal to 3.9 percent of gross domestic product. In 2007 there were 2.2 physicians and 6.4 hospital beds per 1,000 people. The system is funded by the National Health Care Insurance Fund, to which employers and employees make mandatory contributions. Private health care system has developed slowly but now consists of 22 private hospitals and more than 240 clinics.

=== Russia ===
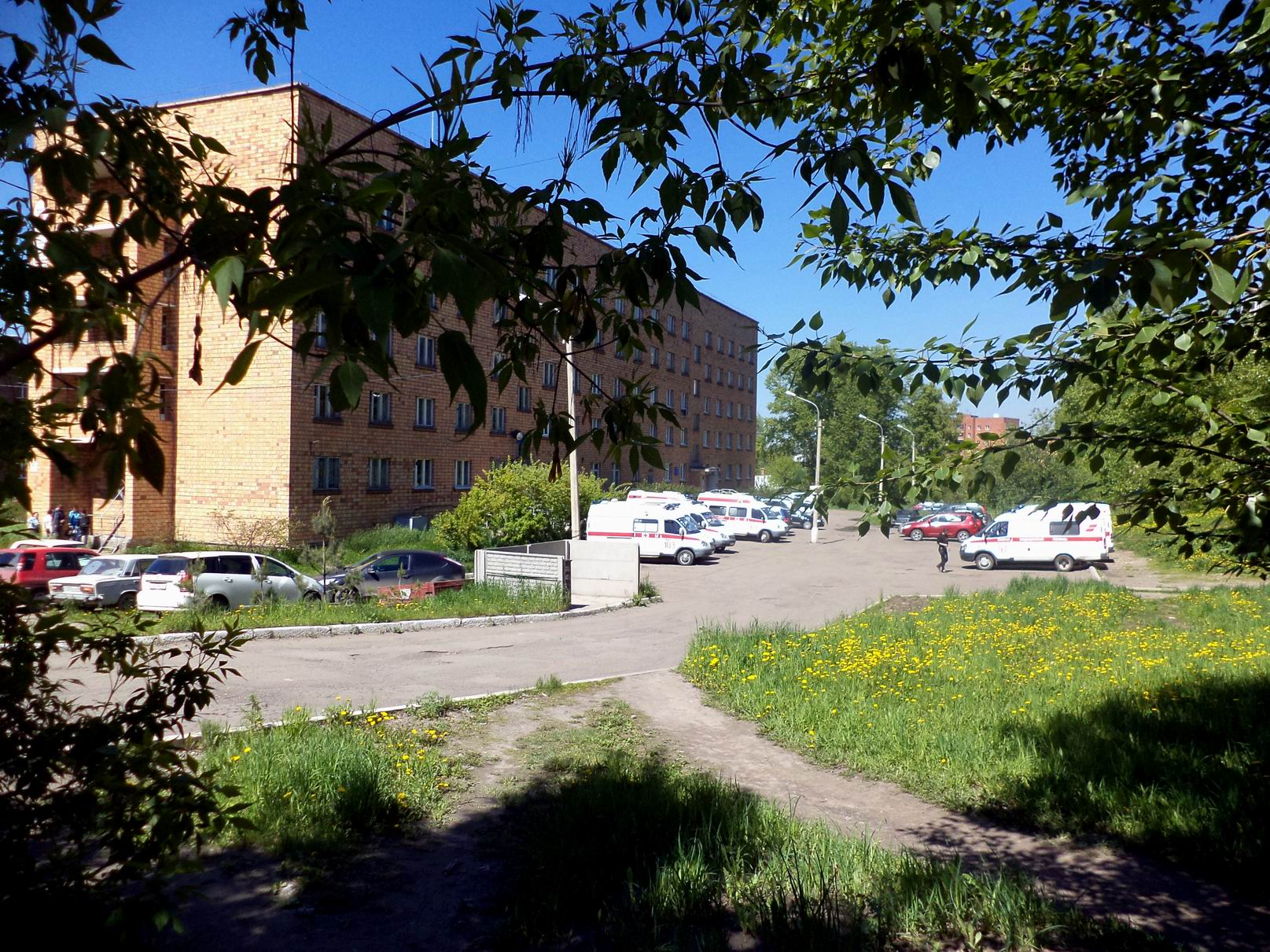
An ambulance station in Krasnoyarsk

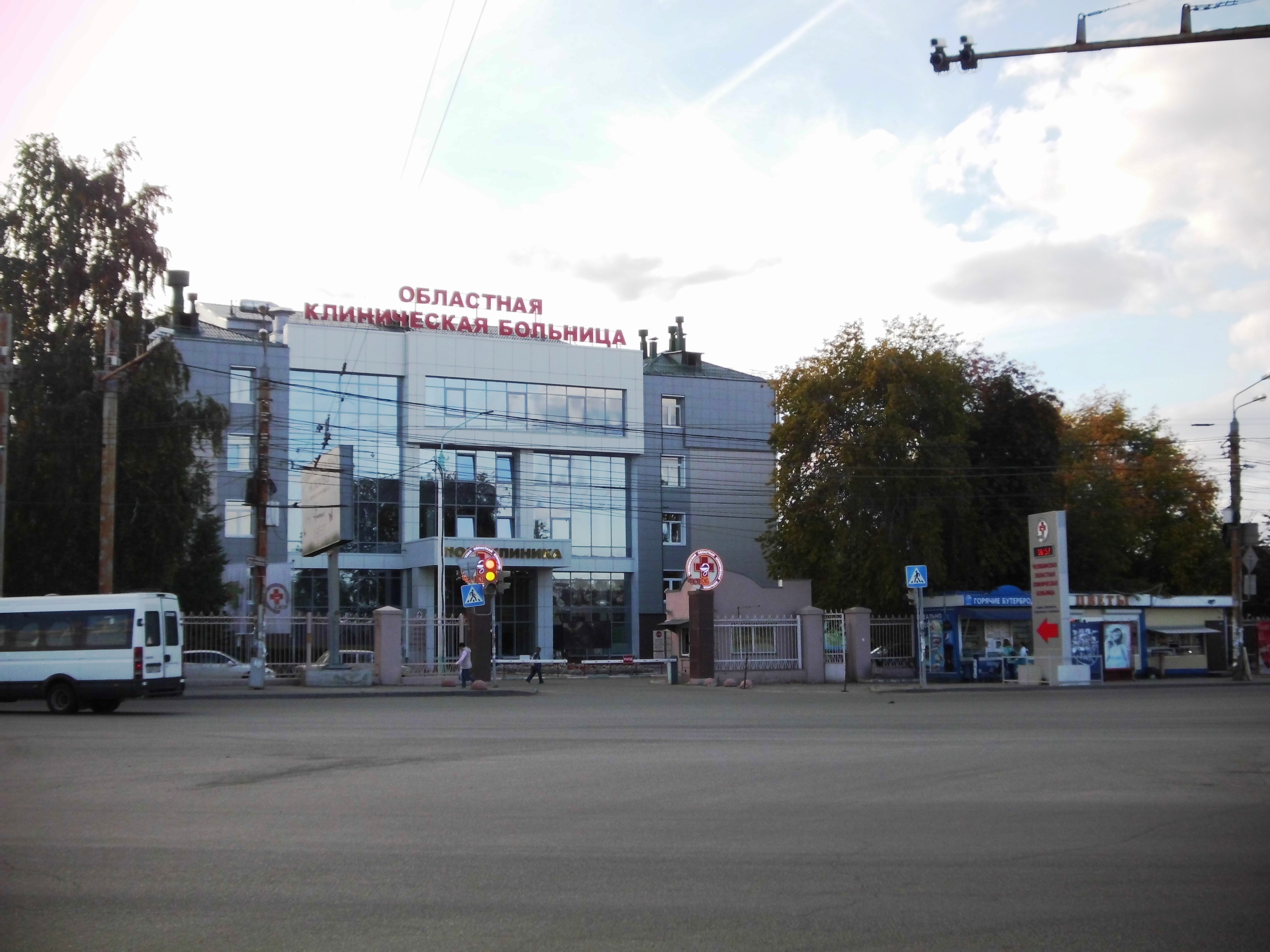
Labels "clinical hospital" and "polyclinic" in Chelyabinsk

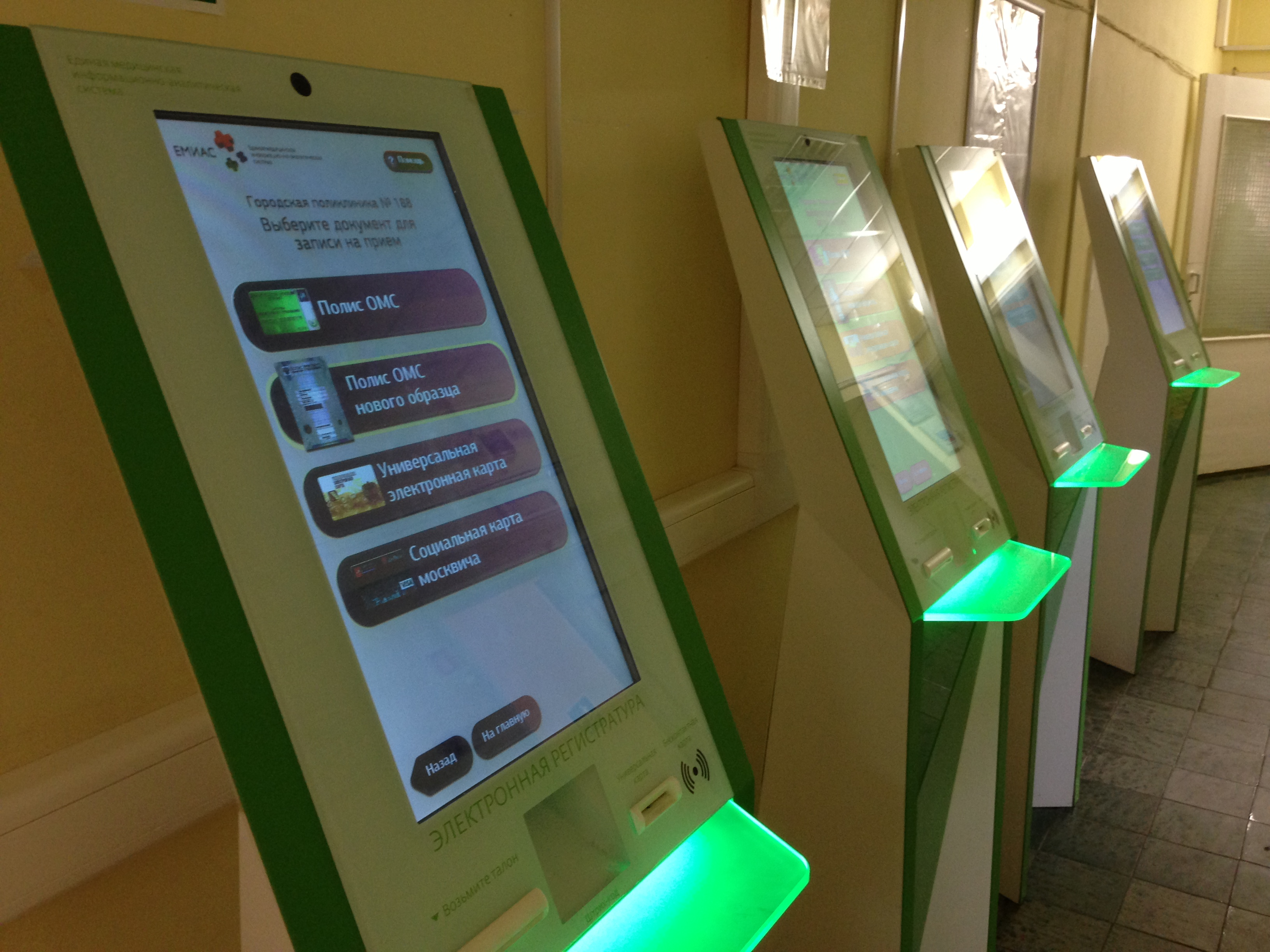
Terminals for the booking (EMIAS) of polyclinic visits in Moscow using the new OMS insurance policy, the old OMS card or special ATM cards

Russia in 1991-1993 has changed to a mixed model of health care. Article 41 of the 1993 constitution confirmed a citizen's right to healthcare and medical assistance free of charge in state and municipal health establishments. Private clinics are separate system and it is funded by separate payments of their clients or by private insurance companies via paid voluntary health insurance (known as ДМС - DMS). Only paid clinics allow all types of anonymous medical care. State and municipal health establishments also have the right to provide paid services to any person or in addition to free services.

In all life-threatening cases, emergency medical services, including ambulance vehicles, hospitalization, surgery, etc., are completely free of charge and any documents and name/surname are not required. According to the law "on the basics of health protection of citizens", emergency assistance is provided by a medical organization and a medical employee immediately and free of charge. Refusal to provide it is not allowed. If a medical organization participates in the program of state guarantees of free medical care, it is not allowed to refuse to provide medical care and charge fees. In both of the above cases, a medical employee and a medical organization can be punished under the Criminal Code if the patient has suffered "medium harm" or higher as a result of the lack of aid.

State and municipal health establishments and their workers are funded by multiple sources. The system of compulsory medical insurance (обязательное медицинское страхование, ОМС - obyzatel'noye meditsinskoye strakhovaniye, OMS) is funded by general taxes of individuals and companies via federal, regional and municipal budgets and by employer's additional quasi-tax obligatory payments (officially called "insurance contributions" but collected by Tax Service) via the Federal Compulsory Medical Insurance Fund and Territorial Funds of Russian regions. Medical aid in state and municipal health establishments is available for free to all citizens as well as to foreign permanent residents, foreign temporary residents, stateless persons and refugees regardless of their income or employment status, in all cases with mandatory and free-of-charge pre-conclusion of a contract, confirmed by OMS insurance policy (полис ОМС - polis OMS), with one of the private insurance companies decided to participate in the OMS system. Internal passport of Russia and Individual insurance account number are required for Russian citizens. Identity document and legal status in Russia are required for foreigners and stateless persons. Lack of legal status for foreigners and military service in the Russian Armed Forces for Russian citizens are the only reasons for refusal to obtain or use OMS insurance policy provided that it is not allowed to have two OMS insurance policies. On 1 January 2018, 146.3 million persons were in the OMS system, including 66.4 mln employed and 79.9 mln unemployed persons (the total population of Russia on 1 January 2018 was 146 880 432 persons).

OMS insurance policy is a document confirming the right to receive free medical care. OMS insurance policy or its details are required when applying to state and municipal health establishments. If a person has OMS insurance policy, but does not have it with him, it is not possible to refuse him medical care. A person must choose a permanent establishment for medical care. Health establishment can refuse only in case of overcrowding. Basic services are available for free throughout the country while regional list of services is available for free only in a region of permanent residence. In some cases, free treatment in private clinics (that decided to participate in the OMS system, in very limited cases since this is one of the recent changes to the system), free dental prosthetics and free medications are available through the OMS system. Introduction in 1993 reform of new free market providers in addition to the state-run institutions intended to promote both efficiency and patient choice. A purchaser-provider split help facilitate the restructuring of care, as resources would migrate to where there was greatest demand, reduce the excess capacity in the hospital sector and stimulate the development of primary care. Russian prime minister Vladimir Putin announced a new large-scale health care reform in 2011 and pledged to allocate more than 300 billion rubles ($10 billion) in the next few years to improve health care in the country. He also said that obligatory medical insurance tax paid by companies will increase from current 3.1% to 5.1% starting from 2011.

=== Sweden ===
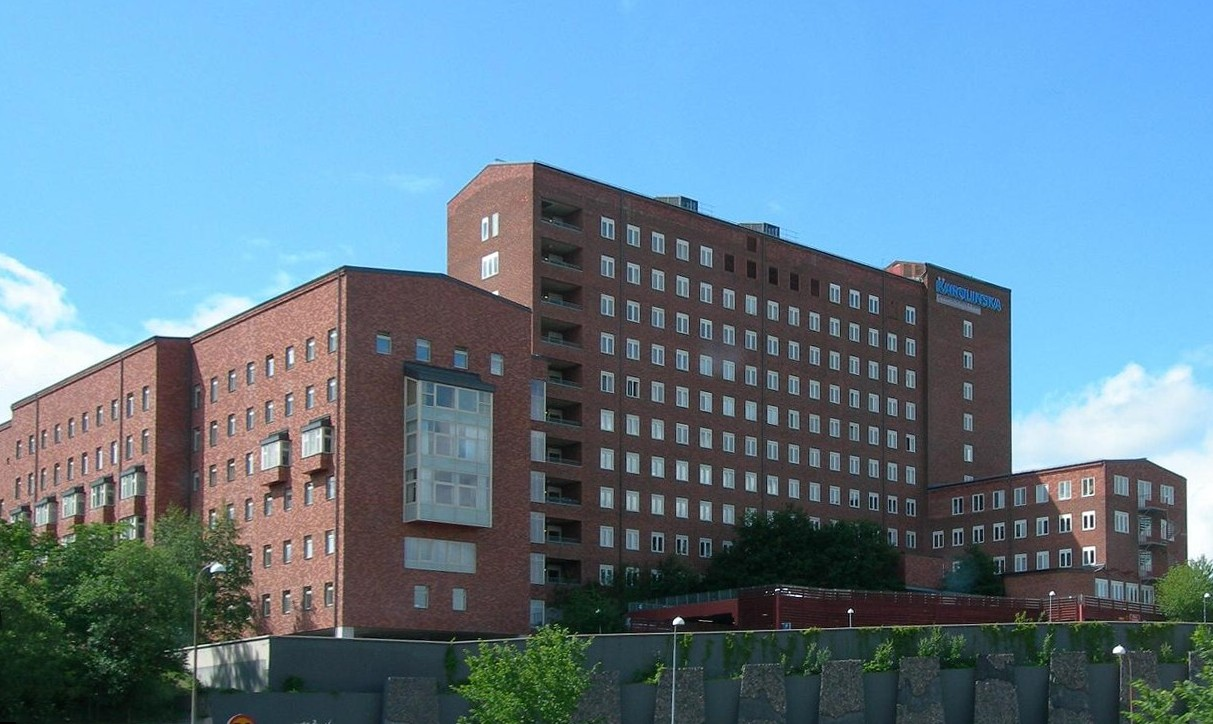
Karolinska university hospital in Stockholm (2006)

The Swedish public health system is funded through taxes levied by the county councils, but partly run by private companies. There is a fixed charge of SEK 150 (US$21) for each visit to a doctor or a hospital but some may vary depending on the business itself and cause of admission & desired service whereas prices can vary up to SEK 350 (US$52). Healthcare services that are accepted by the Swedish Board of Health (hälsovårdsnämnden) have "safe net" limits for visitors placed upon them to a maximum SEK 800 (US$111) per year along with prescription medicine from those clinics are also limited to 1,800 SEK (US$249) per year. Government-paid dental care for children under 23 years old is included in the system, and dental care for grown-ups is to a small extent subsidised by it. Sweden also has a smaller private health care sector, mainly in larger cities or as centers for preventive health care financed by employers.

=== Switzerland ===
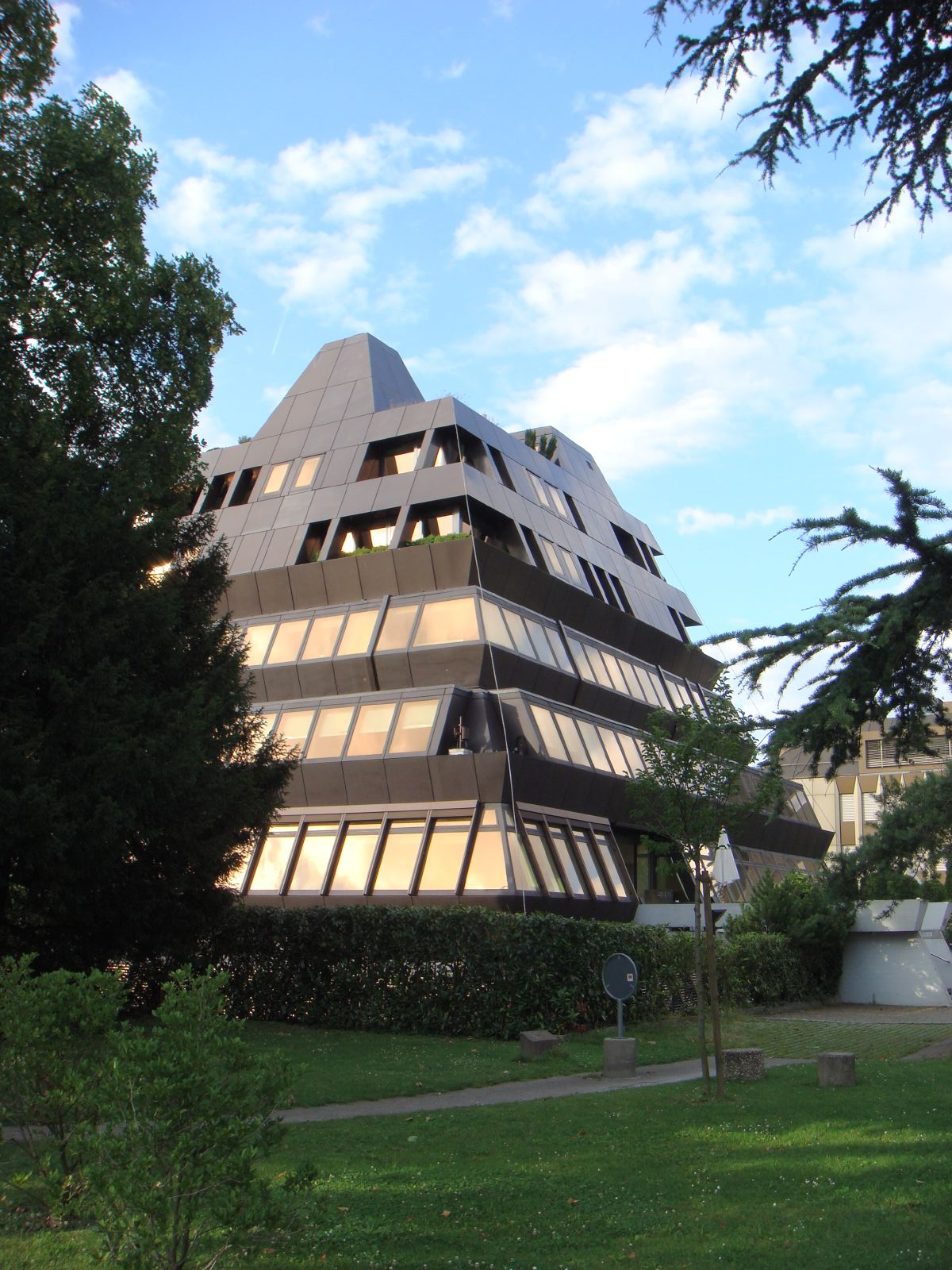
A private hospital in Zurich, Switzerland

In Switzerland, compulsory health insurance covers the costs of medical treatment and hospitalization of the insured. The Swiss healthcare system is a combination of public, subsidized private and totally private healthcare providers, where the insured person has full freedom of choice among the providers in his region. Insurance companies independently set their price points for different age groups, but are forbidden from setting prices based on health risk. In 2000, Switzerland topped all European countries' health care expenditure when calculated as per capita expenditure in US dollar purchasing parity terms.

The Swiss health care system was the last for-profit system in Europe. In the 1990s, after the private carriers began to deny coverage for pre-existing conditions – and when the uninsured population of Switzerland reached 5% – the Swiss held a referendum (1995) and adopted their present system.

=== Turkey ===
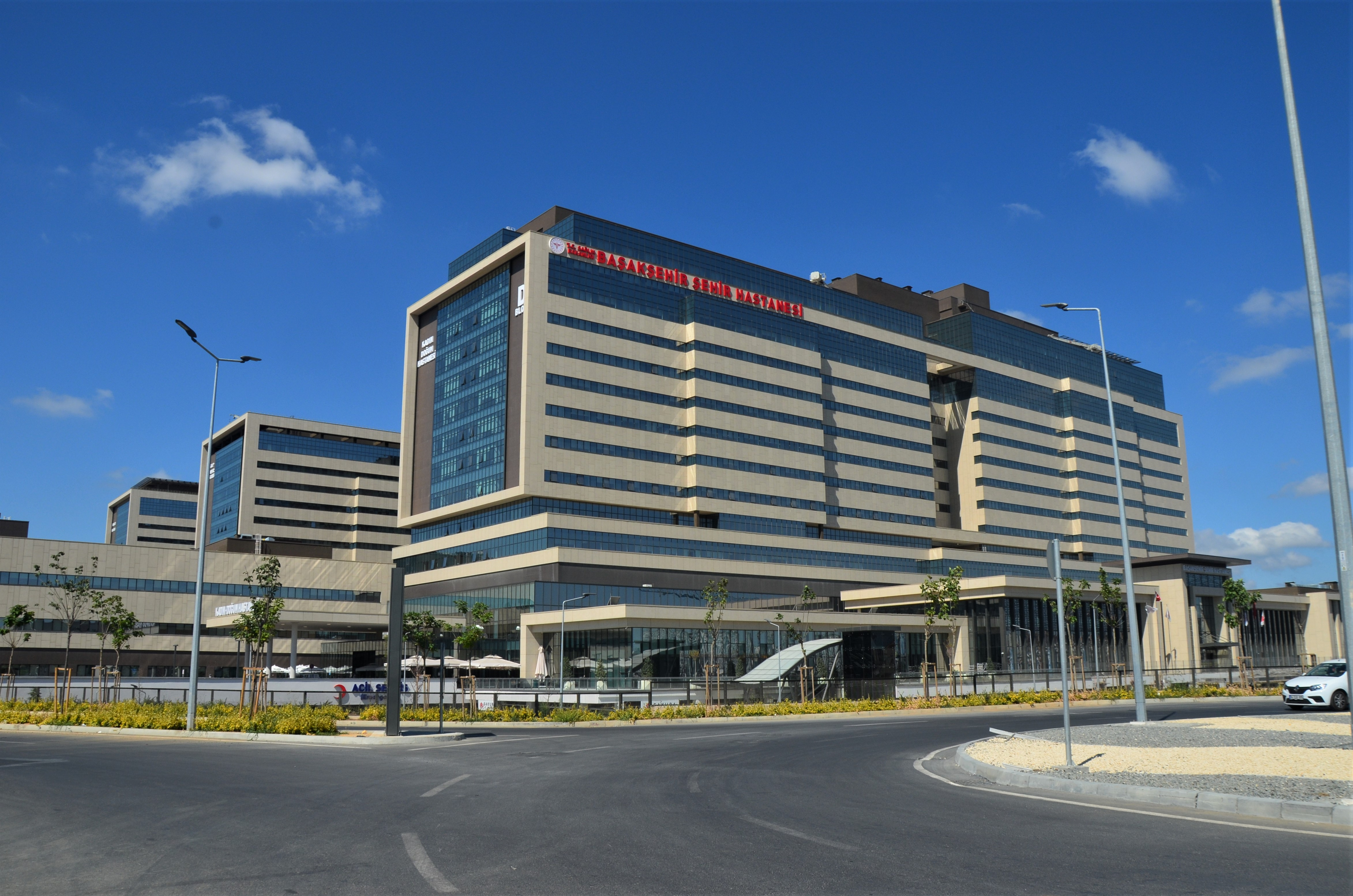
A hospital in Istanbul, Turkey

Health care in Turkey used to be dominated by a centralized state system run by the Ministry of Health. In 2003 the government introduced a sweeping health reform program aimed at increasing the ratio of private to state health provision and making health care available to a larger share of the population. Information from the Turkish Statistical Institute states that 76.3 billions of Turkish liras are being spent in healthcare, with 79.6% of funding coming from the Sosyal Güvenlik Kurumu and most of the remainder (15.4%) coming from out-of-pocket payments. There are 27.954 medical institutions, one doctor for 587 people and 2.54 beds for 1000 people.

=== United Kingdom ===
The four countries of the United Kingdom have separate but co-operating public health care systems that were created in 1948: in England the public health system is known as the National Health Service, in Scotland it is known as NHS Scotland, in Wales as NHS Wales (GIG Cymru), and in Northern Ireland it is called Health and Social Care in Northern Ireland. All four provide state-paid healthcare to all UK residents, paid for from general taxation. Though the public systems dominate, private health care and a wide variety of alternative and complementary treatments are available for those who have private health insurance or are willing to pay directly themselves.

One difference between the four public health care systems is the patient cost for prescriptions. Wales, Northern Ireland and Scotland have recently abolished, or are in the process of abolishing, all prescription charges, while England (with the exception of birth control pills, which are paid for by the state) continues to charge patients who are between 18 and 60 years old a fixed prescription fee of £9.15 per item or yearly prepayment of £105.90, unless they are exempt because of certain medical conditions (including cancer) or are on low income. Since health care delivery is a devolved matter, considerable differences are developing between the systems in each of the countries.

==== England ====
Health care in England is mainly provided by the National Health Service (NHS), a public body that provides healthcare to all permanent residents in England, that is free at the point of use. The body is one of four forming the UK National Health Service as health is a devolved matter; there are differences with the provisions for healthcare elsewhere in the United Kingdom, and in England it is overseen by NHS England. Though the public system dominates healthcare provision in England, private health care and a wide variety of alternative and complementary treatments are available for those willing and able to pay.

The secretary of state for health and social care is a senior minister of the Crown within the Government of the United Kingdom, and leads the Department of Health and Social Care with responsibility for England's NHS. The secretary serves as the principal adviser to the prime minister of the United Kingdom on all health matters.

==== Scotland ====
The National Health Service (NHS) in Scotland was created by the National Health Service (Scotland) Act 1947 in 1948 at the same time the NHS was created for England and Wales. Scotland's NHS remains a separate body from the other public health systems in the UK which can lead to confusion from patients when "cross-border" or emergency care is involved. Primary and secondary care are integrated in Scotland. Unlike in England, NHS trusts do not exist in Scotland. Instead, healthcare is provided through fourteen regional health boards. These health boards are further subdivided into Health and Social Care Partnerships. The Scottish Ambulance Service is the pan-Scotland board responsible for prehospital care provision and transport of patients between the mainland and the Scottish Islands. The ambulance service is supported by the Emergency Medical Retrieval Service and BASICS Scotland.

Scotland spent over £12 billion on healthcare in 2015/16 which accounted for 40% of the Scottish Government's total budget. The NHS in Scotland consists of approximately 161,000 employees, 9.2% of whom are medical or dental doctors, 42.9% nurses and midwives, 18.2% administrative services, 3.9% healthcare scientists, and the remaining 25.8% in various other medical services. In the past several years, healthcare costs have been rising in Scotland. Despite this, Scots have a generally favorable view of their NHS service with 61% of the population either very or quite satisfied with the service.

==== Northern Ireland ====
The Health and Social Care service was created by the Parliament of Northern Ireland in 1948 after the Beveridge Report. From 1948 to 1974, hospitals in the region were managed by the Northern Ireland Hospitals Authority and hospital management committees, and then transferred to four health and social services boards, along with responsibility for social care. The pattern of local government in the region was of 26 single-tier local authorities which, apart from Belfast, covered small populations ranging from 13,000 to 90,000 and were not considered an adequate base for the provision of personal social services.

The Health and Social Care (Reform) Act (Northern Ireland) 2009 led to a reorganisation of health and social care delivery in Northern Ireland, reducing the number of organisations involved. This Act established the Health and Social Care Board and five Health and Social Care Trusts which are responsible for the delivery of primary, secondary and community health care. The act also established five local commissioning groups which work in parallel with the health and social care trusts.

==== Wales ====
Healthcare in Wales is mainly provided by the Welsh public health service, NHS Wales. NHS Wales provides healthcare to all permanent residents that is free at the point of need and paid for from general taxation. Health is a matter that is devolved, and considerable differences are now developing between the public healthcare systems in the different countries of the United Kingdom, collectively the National Health Service (NHS). Though the public system dominates healthcare provision, private health care and a wide variety of alternative and complementary treatments are available for those willing to pay.

Unlike in England, NHS prescriptions are free to everyone registered with a GP in Wales (although those on low incomes, under 18, and under 60 do get prescriptions for free in England). Initially administered by the UK Government, since 1999 NHS Wales has been funded and managed by the Welsh Government.

== Oceania ==
=== Australia ===
In Australia the current system, known as Medicare, was created in 1984. It coexists with a private health system. All legal permanent residents are entitled to government-paid public hospital care. Treatment by private doctors is also paid by the government when the doctor direct bills the Health Department (called bulk billing). Medicare is funded partly by a 1.5% income tax levy (with exceptions for low-income earners), but mostly out of general revenue. An additional levy of 1% is imposed on high-income earners without private health insurance. There is a means tested 30% subsidy on private health insurance. As well as Medicare, there is a separate Pharmaceutical Benefits Scheme under which listing and a government subsidy is dependent on expert evaluation of the comparative cost-effectiveness of new pharmaceuticals. In 2005, Australia spent 8.8% of GDP on health care, or US$3,181 per capita. Of that, approximately 67% was government expenditure.

=== New Zealand ===
In New Zealand hospitals are public and treat citizens or permanent residents, with the fees paid by the government, and are managed by district health boards. Under the Labour coalition governments (1999–2008), there were plans to make primary health care available with charges paid for by the government. At present government subsidies exist in health care. The cost of visiting a GP ranges from government-paid to $45.00 for children and from government-paid to $75.00 for adults under the current subsidies. This system is funded by taxes. The New Zealand government agency Pharmac subsidizes certain pharmaceuticals depending upon their category. Co-payments exist, however these are lower if the user has a Community Services Card or High User Health Card. In 2005, New Zealand spent 8.9% of GDP on health care, or US$2,403 per capita. Of that, approximately 77% was government expenditure.

== See also ==
- List of countries and dependencies by number of physicians
- Tobacco control laws by country
- International comparisons
- Teamwork
