= Scarborough General Hospital =

Scarborough General Hospital can refer to:

- Scarborough General Hospital (England)
- Scarborough General Hospital, Tobago
- Scarborough General Hospital (Toronto)
