= Healthcare in Trinidad and Tobago =

Trinidad and Tobago Ministry of Health
- The "Coat of Arms" is used as the Ministry's seal.

Agency overview
- Jurisdiction: Government of Trinidad and Tobago
- Minister responsible: Dr Lackram Bodoe, Minister Of Health
- Deputy Minister responsible: Dr Rishad Seecheran, Minister in the Ministry of Health
- Agency executive: Asif Ali, Permanent Secretary
- Child agencies: North West Regional Health Authority; North Central Regional Health Authority; Eastern Regional Health Authority; South West Regional Health Authority; Tobago Regional Health Authority
- Website: https://health.gov.tt

Trinidad and Tobago operates under a two-tier healthcare system. That is, there is the existence of both private and public facilities.

The Ministry of Health is responsible for leading the health sector. The service provision aspect of public healthcare has been devolved to newly created entities, the Regional Health Authorities (RHAs). Responsibility for the provision of healthcare services in Trinidad and Tobago was devolved from the Ministry of Health to Regional Health Authorities under the Regional Health Authorities Act No. 5 in 1994.

While the Ministry of Health does not directly run health facilities, it is required to play a key role in ensuring that they are properly run, by setting policies, goals and targets for Regions based on assessment of real health needs. This is the main role of the Ministry of Health. The Ministry also allocates resources to the RHAs to finance their operations. The Ministry of Health is shifting its focus to concentrate on policy development, planning, monitoring and evaluation, regulation, financing and research. Citizens can access free health care at public healthcare facilities where health insurance is not required. However, the government is developing the National Health Service in which a package of services is to be determined, as well as a financing strategy.

== Public and private ==
Public Healthcare is free to everyone in Trinidad and Tobago and is paid for by the Government and taxpayers. Healthcare services are provided on a walk-in basis. There are a few major hospitals throughout the country as well as smaller health centers and clinics located regionally throughout.

Several major hospitals in Trinidad and Tobago are:

1. Port of Spain General Hospital located in the country's capital of Port of Spain. It is a major trauma centre in the Caribbean.
2. San Fernando General Hospital located in the City of San Fernando.
3. San Fernando Teaching Hospital located in the City of San Fernando.
4. Arima General Hospital and District Health Facility located in the Borough of Arima, next to the Arima Velodrome.
5. Sangre Grande Hospital located in Sangre Grande, Trinidad.
6. Point Fortin Hospital located in the Borough of Point Fortin.
7. Eric Williams Medical Science Complex located in Champ Fleurs, Trinidad.
8. Scarborough General Hospital located in Signal Hill, Tobago

These hospitals are aided by many DHF'S (District Health Facilities) located throughout the country.

== Reform ==
The Ministry of Health is mandated to provide a functioning healthcare system to benefit all citizens. This had led to the reforming of the entire healthcare system in the country.

Recently, the government of Trinidad and Tobago has launched Chronic Disease Assistance Programme (CDAP). The Chronic Disease Assistance Programme provides citizens with free prescription drugs and other pharmaceutical items to combat the following health conditions:

- Diabetes
- Asthma
- Cardiac Diseases
- Arthritis
- Glaucoma
- Mental Depression
- High Blood Pressure
- Benign Prostatic Hyperplasia (Enlarged Prostate)
- Epilepsy
- Hypercholesterolemia
- Parkinson’s disease
- Thyroid diseases

There are over 250 pharmacies throughout the country that provide medications through CDAP. All citizens of Trinidad & Tobago are eligible. There are no age restrictions or exceptions.

== See also ==
- Health in Trinidad and Tobago
- Universal healthcare
