= Two-tier healthcare =

Unequal access to higher quality healthcare

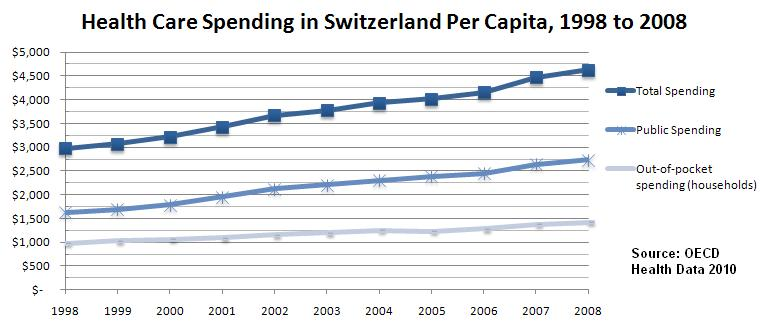
This graph contrasts total health care spending with public spending, in US dollars adjusted for purchasing power parity in Switzerland.

Two-tier healthcare is a situation in which a basic government-provided healthcare system provides basic care, and a secondary tier of care exists for those who can pay for additional, better quality or faster access. Most countries have both publicly and privately funded healthcare, but the degree to which it creates a quality differential depends on the way the two systems are managed, funded, and regulated.

Some publicly funded universal healthcare systems deliver excellent service and the private system tends to be small and not highly differentiated. In other, typically poorer countries, the public health system is underfunded and overstretched, offering opportunities for private companies to deliver better-quality, albeit more expensive coverage.

== Canada ==
In Canada, patients have freedom with regard to which doctors and facilities they use. Under Canada's single-payer system, all Canadian citizens have the right to access healthcare services governed by provincial and territorial authorities. Within a person's province of residence, where they pay taxes, they are able to access any doctor they choose for most basic and essential healthcare services free of charge. Both referrals to specialists and hospital visits are covered.

The decentralized, universal, publicly-funded health system is called Canadian Medicare. The federal government distributes funds to the provinces for healthcare, providing that the provinces have designed their systems to meet certain criteria, which they all do at present. Most people receiving care in Canada do not pay for their care apart from prescriptions and certain procedures that are not covered, such as visits to dentists, optometrists, and some others. The healthcare system is financed primarily through tax revenue. Canadians can choose to purchase health insurance to cover some or all of the healthcare services that are not covered by the government. Medical providers are generally paid fixed fees depending on the type of visit. The average doctor is paid $258,049 a year for the care provided. In situations where a doctor is being paid by their respective provincial healthcare system, the law bans the medical provider from charging patients to supplement their income from Medicare.

Canada technically does not have a two-tiered healthcare system. However, some services in Canada are covered not by government provided healthcare, but instead by the private sector (dentistry, laser eye surgery, most cosmetic plastic surgeries), while most basic essential services are provided by the public healthcare systems, which are primarily administered by the country's 13 provinces and territories. Each province and territory has their own insurance plan receiving federal funding on a per-capita basis. About 70% of Canada's healthcare spending is via the public system. The other 30% comes from private funding, divided approximately equally between out-of-pocket funding and private insurance, which may be complementary (meeting costs not covered by the public system such as the cost of prescription medicines, dental treatments, and copayments) or supplementary (adding more choice of provider or providing faster access to care). Financial disincentives are in place to make private medicine for services that are covered by Medicare less economical.

Six of Canada's ten provinces used to ban private insurance for publicly insured services to inhibit queue jumping and so preserve fairness in the health care system. In 2005, the Supreme Court of Canada ruled that in Quebec, such bans are unconstitutional if the waiting period for care is excessively long. However, this ruling only applies within the Province of Quebec. A second court challenge to determine whether the prohibition of private parallel health care violates the patients' right to life, liberty, and security under Section 7 of the Canadian Charter of Rights and Freedoms was defeated by the Supreme Court of British Columbia in 2020.

Some private hospitals operating at the time the national healthcare plan was being instituted (for example, the Shouldice Hernia Centre in Thornhill, Ontario) continue to operate, but they may not bill additional charges for medical procedures. The Shouldice Hospital, however, has mandatory additional room charges not covered by public health insurance. That effectively places it in the "upper tier" of a two-tier system. Welfare recipients, for example, cannot be referred there, as they would not be able to afford the extra costs.

Clinics are usually private operations but may not bill additional charges. Private healthcare may also be supplied, both in uncovered fields and to foreigners.

== Denmark ==
Healthcare in Denmark, although primarily subsidised by the government at the county and the national levels health, is supported by complementary insurance plans to cover elective services not covered by the public system; they also help cover copayments.

== France ==
Healthcare in France is a system of private and public physicians, who largely draw their income from the government. There are public as well as private hospitals.

Patients pay a small copayment for certain aspects of care, but many people choose to cover the costs by taking out supplemental health insurance for which a small premium is payable each year.

Thus, France also has a mixed delivery system with complete patient freedom of supplier choice. There is a two-tier funding arrangement, with compulsory funding of core medical services from taxation, with optional private insurance for the cost of copayments.

== Germany ==
Healthcare in Germany has two branches of health insurance, public and private, with multiple insurers each, where the public ones are either publicly owned or not-for-profit mutuals. Membership in public health insurance is mandatory for most people, and only those with large incomes, public servants, and the self-employed in a list of particular occupations are eligible to opt out. Doctors are usually self-employed, and hospitals may be publicly owned, privately owned or non-profit.

== Ireland ==
Healthcare in the Republic of Ireland is financed mainly by the state. However, all citizens have the option of buying additional private health insurance, provided by four companies. They include VHI, a large publicly owned insurer, operating, like all other insurers, community rating; people are insured at the same basic rate regardless of health status. The other insurers are Glo Healthcare, LAYA and Avivia. Also, much smaller restricted membership companies provide benefits for certain professions, such as police officers.

There are public as well as private hospitals. Private patients are often treated in public hospitals, as all privately insured patients have an entitlement to use the publicly funded system.

== Netherlands ==
Healthcare in the Netherlands is essentially single tier, with all persons accessing a common system of private and public providers with complete freedom of choice between providers. Insurers are all private companies. It is heavily subsidized from tax revenues and heavily regulated, with a common, regulated standard insurance policy coverage set nationwide for all providers and a more flexible top up insurance, which is less regulated and set by each company as it chooses.

Insurers set a standard price for each adult for the year throughout the country and must insure all people who apply for insurance at that price regardless of the age or health status of the applicant. An equalization fund, which is essentially a national sickness fund funded from a form of income tax on employers and employees, is used to pay for the health care of all children and to compensate insurers if they have more high risk profile clients than the other insurers.

Thus, Dutch insurers welcome the sick and the elderly because they are fully compensated for the higher-risk profile of these clients. People living in more expensive areas of the country have to pay higher premiums, since they get less compensation from the government because they can afford to pay more but the elderly and the sick pay the same premiums as everyone else in that region. Social insurance covers the insurance costs of those with limited incomes, such as the unemployed and the permanently disabled.

== Singapore ==
Healthcare in Singapore uses a true two-tier system for both the provider network and the insurance funds. A government-sponsored and subsidized system of hospitals accepts all patients, with a guaranteed list of services. A parallel system of private hospitals provides services not available in public hospitals or available with extra amenities (such as private rooms and other boutique services).

Singapore uses a universal insurance fund in which all citizens are required to participate, as a baseline. Seniors and certain groups are subsidised in their membership in the universal basic insurance fund.

Optional additional supplementary insurance funds are available for purchase for elective coverage, such as for plastic surgery or for extra amenities in hospital.

== Spain ==
Private insurance, private hospitals and private management of public hospitals exist in Spain, and coexist with hospitals completely run by the government. Public insurance guarantees universal coverage, with no expenditure from patients other than a fraction of prescription drug cost. Some private hospitals are only accessible with private insurance. The system is regularly ranked amongst the world's best.

== Switzerland ==
Private health insurance is compulsory for all persons residing in Switzerland. Insurance companies are required to sell the compulsory basic health insurance at cost, and individuals who cannot afford the premium (based on a premium-to-income ratio) are provided with public cash subsidies. Public hospitals are subsidised, but there are also private hospitals that provide additional services, such as elective services.

In addition to the compulsory basic health insurance, optional complementary and supplementary private insurance plans are available for purchase.

== United Kingdom ==
The National Health Service (or NHS) provides universal coverage to all residents of the United Kingdom.

Private healthcare has continued parallel to the NHS, paid for largely by private insurance, and is used by about 11% of the population, generally as an add-on to NHS services and mostly obtained by employer funded insurance schemes. That is a taxable benefit to the employee, the value imputed by the tax authorities as income to the beneficiary. Because NHS services are so comprehensive, there are many areas in which the private sector usually does not compete and private insurers almost always refuse to fund. Childbirth and perinatal services are good examples.

Conversely, there are some areas where the NHS does not offer free treatment (cosmetic surgery for vanity purposes, for example) and so the private sector offers a pay-for-service alternative.

Historically, avoiding waiting lists was the main reason that patients opted out of NHS treatment and into private care. Queues of many months are common. NHS Consultants, who can run both NHS and private services during their NHS contracts, used to be in charge of waiting lists and had a financial incentive to keep the public waiting list long, to ensure a stream of private income to the private business.

Since the Blair government reforms of the NHS, strict rules apply to waiting lists (see hospital choice in the NHS). That and the allocation of better funding in hospitals both reduced waiting times significantly. Most hospital patients are in fact not admitted from a list at all, and those that do, on average, wait less than 9 weeks. Nobody should wait more than 18 weeks. The 18 weeks is not dead time because it includes the time taken to book a first appointment, to conduct all the tests, for the doctor and patient to agree on the desired treatment, and to book and execute an operation or commence the treatment regime. A patient not seen in the 18-week period without just cause has the legal right to go private at the NHS's expense.} As of August 2020, 53.6% of patients were waiting for more than 18 weeks.

As a result of these improvements, long waiting times reduced, and the private healthcare sector now sells its surplus capacity to the NHS. Dentistry is an area where many practitioners prefer to work privately (because they can set their own fees). NHS dentistry can then be patchy, and some people may find that private dentistry is the only practical option open to them in their locality.

There has always been a degree of private medicine conducted within NHS hospitals, with private work being done in those hospitals and the patient being accommodated in segregated accommodation. Until recently, few NHS patients were ever treated in private hospitals. In the English NHS, however, there has been greater willingness to outsource some work to the private sector, and so some NHS patients do sometimes gain access to private health care facilities at public expense. The equivalent NHS operations in Wales, Scotland and Northern Ireland do not often fund treatment outside of their own facilities.

Whether the NHS funds treatment in a private hospital is a decision for the local commissioning health authority based on formal service contracts.

== United States ==
The United States has a two-tier health system, but most of the population cannot gain access to the public provision tiers. Healthcare provided directly by the government is limited to military and veteran families and to certain Native American tribes. Certain cities and towns also provide free care directly but only to those who cannot afford to pay. Medicare, Medicaid, and the State Children's Health Insurance Program pay for health care obtained at private facilities but only for the elderly, disabled, and children in poor families. Since enacting the Patient Protection and Affordable Care Act in 2010, Medicaid has been substantially expanded, and federal subsidies are available for low- to middle-income individuals and families to purchase private health insurance.

The debate over healthcare reform in the United States has included a proposal for a public option or Medicare for all, a government-run insurance program, available to all US citizens, to compete with or replace private insurance plans.

== See also ==
- Global health
- Health insurance marketplace
- Health policy
- Health system
- Health law
- Health in Trinidad and Tobago
- Canadian and American health care systems compared
- Health care compared – tabular comparisons of the US, Canada, and other countries not shown above
- Universal health care
