= Health in Trinidad and Tobago =

The life expectancy in Trinidad and Tobago at birth was 70 years, and “healthy” life expectancy 61 years in 2015.

About 9% of the population have diabetes. The number of obese primary school children increased from around 11% in 1999 to 23% in 2009. Deaths from tuberculosis declined from 2.1 per 100,000 population in 2010 to 1.1 in 2015.

See also: Healthcare in Trinidad and Tobago

== See also ==
- Healthcare in Trinidad and Tobago
