= Scarborough General Hospital, Tobago =

Scarborough General Hospital
- TRHA

- Scarborough General Hospital, Tobago

Geography
- Location: Signal Hill, City of Scarborough, Tobago, Trinidad and Tobago
- Coordinates: 11°10′49″N 60°45′11″W

Organisation
- Care system: Tobago Regional Health Authority
- Type: General
- Affiliated university: Tobago House of Assembly
- Patron: Ministry of Health - Trinidad and Tobago

Services
- Emergency department: Yes
- Beds: 100

Helipads
- Helipad: Yes

History
- Founded: 2012

Links
- Website: http://www.trha.co.tt
- Lists: Hospitals in Trinidad and Tobago

Scarborough General Hospital is a hospital in the City of Scarborough, Trinidad and Tobago. It is the only hospital for the entire Island of Tobago.

This Institution falls under the Tobago Regional Health Authority (TRHA).
