= List of countries by suicide rate =

A map of global suicide rates, age-standardized per 100,000 population, 2021: >30; 20–30; 15–20; 10–15; 0–5; Data unavailable

The following are lists of countries by estimated suicide rates as published by the World Health Organization (WHO) and other sources. (Note: The first global estimates on suicide mortality began in the early 1980s, as a single World Bank-commissioned study on general mortality data compiled by the WHO as the first work of its kind on the global burden of disease (GBD). In the following years, the Institute for Health Metrics and Evaluation acted as the coordinating center for the study then resulted in the collaboration between several researchers and institutions from many countries.)

In many countries, suicide rates are underreported due to social stigma, cultural or legal concerns. Thus, these figures may not reflect actual suicide rates, which are unknown in many countries.

The global total of suicide deaths decreased from an estimated 762,000 in 2000 to 717,000 in 2021, which is 9.1 deaths per 100,000 population. In high-income countries, male and female rates of suicidal behaviors differ compared to the rest of the world: while women are reportedly more prone to suicidal thoughts, rates of suicide are higher among men, which has been described as a "silent epidemic".

In 2021, the global rate of suicide deaths for men was 12.3 per 100,000, more than double the rate for women, which stood at 5.9 per 100,000 population. However, the sex disparity was uneven across regions, with a male-to-female ratio ranging from as low as 1.4 in the Southeast Asia Region to nearly 4.0 in the Region of the Americas.

In much of the world, suicide is stigmatized and condemned for religious or cultural reasons. In some countries, suicidal behavior is a criminal offense punishable by law. Suicide is therefore often a secretive act surrounded by taboo, and may be unrecognized, misclassified, or deliberately hidden in official records of death.

— World Health Organization (2002)

As such, suicide rates may be higher than measured, with men more at risk of dying by suicide than women across nearly all cultures and backgrounds. Suicide prevention and intervention is an important topic for all peoples, according to the WHO.

== Countries and territories by suicide rate ==
Background

Suicide rates vary by country but occurs in all regions of the world. In a 2024 WHO report, 73% of reported suicides were in low and middle-income countries. Mental illness and suicide are linked, though many suicides are impulsive and occur due to crisis. Groups subject to discrimination, including refugees, indigenous populations, and LGBTQ people, experience high suicide rates. Societal and cultural taboos around the discussion of topics of suicide and lack of quality suicide data are impeding factors in suicide prevention. Suicide prevention includes such measures as restricting access to methods, responsible media reporting, and treatment and assessment of suicidal people.

Estimated suicide mortality rates by gender and country, age-standardized, per 100K population, World Health Organization Reflects most recent data, 2023
Country or territory	Region	All	Male	Female	Ratio M/F
World		10.3	15	6	2.5
Guyana	Americas	54.8	101.7	16	6.4
Lesotho	Africa	35	66.5	11	6.0
Suriname	Americas	35	62.2	12.3	5.1
Somalia	Africa	27.8	44.6	13.3	3.4
Gabon	Africa	26.3	50.1	4.7	10.7
Eritrea	Africa	25.8	45	10.4	4.3
Central African Republic	Africa	24	48.7	6.2	7.9
South Korea	Asia	23.4	34.8	13.6	2.6
Eswatini	Africa	23	40.9	8.2	5.0
Uruguay	Americas	22.2	35.6	10.7	3.3
Malawi	Africa	21.5	40.1	7.9	5.1
Comoros	Africa	20.8	31	11.6	2.7
Zambia	Africa	20.7	38.2	7.7	5.0
Lithuania	Europe	20.1	34.9	7.2	4.8
Russia	Europe	19.8	36.2	6.8	5.3
Burkina Faso	Africa	19.7	38.3	6.6	5.8
Djibouti	Africa	19.5	30.4	10.4	2.9
Cape Verde	Africa	19.3	37.3	4.4	8.5
Kenya	Africa	19.1	36.1	6.3	5.7
Ukraine	Europe	18.9	35.2	5.8	6.1
Belarus	Europe	18.7	34.5	5.8	5.9
Guinea-Bissau	Africa	18.6	31.9	8.1	3.9
Chad	Africa	18.4	31.1	7.7	4.0
Kazakhstan	Asia	18.2	33.7	6.3	5.3
Nepal	Asia	18	26.7	11.2	2.4
Kiribati	Oceania	18	33.3	4.7	7.1
DR Congo	Africa	18	32.9	5.4	6.1
Angola	Africa	17.6	31.5	6.7	4.7
Burundi	Africa	17.6	29.6	8	3.7
Cameroon	Africa	17.5	31	6	5.2
Congo	Africa	17.3	30.4	5.8	5.2
Ghana	Africa	17.2	31.3	5.8	5.4
Uganda	Africa	17.2	34.2	5.5	6.2
Madagascar	Africa	17	27.4	7.8	3.5
Equatorial Guinea	Africa	16.8	27.7	6.2	4.5
Montenegro	Europe	16.8	29.1	7	4.2
Mozambique	Africa	16.7	31.9	6.3	5.1
Ivory Coast	Africa	16.5	28.7	4.6	6.2
Vanuatu	Oceania	16.4	25.5	7.5	3.4
Benin	Africa	16.2	27.2	7.2	3.8
Namibia	Africa	16.2	29.2	5.9	4.9
South Africa	Africa	16.2	28.1	6	4.7
South Sudan	Africa	16.2	26.8	8.1	3.3
Mongolia	Asia	16	29.4	3.8	7.7
Senegal	Africa	15.8	27.2	4.8	5.7
Botswana	Africa	15.7	26.9	6.1	4.4
Hungary	Europe	15.6	27.3	6.2	4.4
India	Asia	15.3	19.1	11.6	1.6
Belgium	Europe	15.1	21.3	9.4	2.3
Zimbabwe	Africa	15.1	28.1	6.4	4.4
Slovenia	Europe	15	26	5.4	4.8
Togo	Africa	15	27.1	6	4.5
Sierra Leone	Africa	14.9	23.9	7.5	3.2
Tanzania	Africa	14.9	26.2	7	3.7
Cuba	Americas	14.6	25.6	4.9	5.2
Federated States of Micronesia	Oceania	14.6	25.7	4.3	6.0
Rwanda	Africa	14.5	23	8.9	2.7
Ethiopia	Africa	14.4	24.2	6.4	3.8
Solomon Islands	Oceania	14.2	22	6.1	3.6
Estonia	Europe	14	22.6	7.4	3.1
Sri Lanka	Asia	14	25.5	4.9	5.2
France	Europe	13.9	21.1	7.6	2.8
Latvia	Europe	13.7	26.7	3.9	6.8
Gambia	Africa	13.6	22.6	5.7	4.0
Moldova	Europe	13.5	25.3	4.9	5.2
Poland	Europe	13.4	23.8	3.7	6.4
United States	Americas	13.3	21.1	5.8	3.6
Japan	Asia	13.2	18.8	7.9	2.4
Finland	Europe	13.1	19	7.3	2.6
Guinea	Africa	13.1	21.2	6.8	3.1
New Zealand	Oceania	13	19.1	7	2.7
Liberia	Africa	12.9	16.5	9.4	1.8
Austria	Europe	12.7	20.9	5.5	3.8
Sweden	Europe	12.7	17.9	7.7	2.3
Trinidad and Tobago	Americas	12.7	22.9	4	5.7
Australia	Oceania	12.6	19.1	6.2	3.1
Niger	Africa	12.6	19.2	6.9	2.8
Czech Republic	Europe	12.2	20.6	4.6	4.5
Samoa	Oceania	12.1	18.1	6.6	2.7
Croatia	Europe	11.9	20.1	5.3	3.8
Norway	Europe	11.6	16.5	6.9	2.4
Switzerland	Europe	11.6	16	7.5	2.1
Argentina	Americas	11.2	18.3	4.7	3.9
Turkmenistan	Asia	11.1	18.1	5.6	3.2
North Korea	Asia	10.6	14.4	7.2	2.0
Paraguay	Americas	10.6	16.2	5.3	3.1
Mauritius	Africa	10.5	17.6	3.3	5.3
Mali	Africa	10.5	15.2	6.2	2.5
Iceland	Europe	10.4	12.9	7.5	1.7
Bosnia and Herzegovina	Europe	10.2	18	3.8	4.7
Serbia	Europe	10.1	15.4	5.7	2.7
Germany	Europe	10	15.2	5.3	2.9
Vietnam	Asia	10	14.7	6	2.5
Thailand	Asia	9.6	16.3	3.4	4.8
Netherlands	Europe	9.6	13	6.3	2.1
United Kingdom	Europe	9.6	14.4	4.9	2.9
El Salvador	Americas	9.6	17.3	3.8	4.6
Mauritania	Africa	9.6	15.6	4.7	3.3
Belize	Americas	9.5	17	2.3	7.4
Dominican Republic	Americas	9.3	17.1	2.4	7.1
Luxembourg	Europe	9.2	13.5	5.2	2.6
Chile	Americas	9.1	14.8	3.6	4.1
Pakistan	Asia	9.1	15.2	3.3	4.6
Brazil	Americas	8.8	14	4.1	3.4
Mexico	Americas	8.7	14.9	3	5.0
Portugal	Europe	8.6	14.2	3.9	3.6
Denmark	Europe	8.6	12.4	5	2.5
Fiji	Oceania	8.6	12.5	5.1	2.5
Kyrgyzstan	Asia	8.5	13.6	4	3.4
Slovakia	Europe	8.4	15.3	2.8	5.5
Canada	Americas	8.4	12.7	4.3	3.0
Seychelles	Africa	8.4	15.1	1.1	13.7
Romania	Europe	8.2	14.6	2.5	5.8
China	Asia	8	10.1	6	1.7
Venezuela	Americas	8	14.2	2.3	6.2
Uzbekistan	Asia	7.8	9.9	6.1	1.6
Bhutan	Asia	7.7	10.3	4.9	2.1
Bulgaria	Europe	7.6	12.8	3.3	3.9
Saint Lucia	Americas	7.6	15.2	1.1	13.8
Singapore	Asia	7.3	10	4.7	2.1
Ireland	Europe	7.2	11	3.6	3.1
Spain	Europe	7.1	10.9	3.7	2.9
Nicaragua	Americas	7.1	12.1	2.7	4.5
Costa Rica	Americas	6.9	11.5	2.6	4.4
Israel	Asia	6.9	10.7	3.2	3.3
Colombia	Americas	6.8	11.1	3	3.7
Nigeria	Africa	6.5	10	3.3	3.0
Puerto Rico	Americas	6.5	11.1	2.5	4.4
Malta	Europe	6.1	9.9	2.1	4.7
Iran	Asia	6	9	3.2	2.8
Bolivia	Americas	5.8	8.8	3	2.9
Honduras	Americas	5.8	10.2	1.8	5.7
Italy	Europe	5.7	8.9	2.7	3.3
Georgia	Europe	5.6	10.4	1.8	5.8
Ecuador	Americas	5.5	8	3.3	2.4
Guatemala	Americas	5.5	8.9	2.6	3.4
Yemen	Asia	5.5	7.5	3.7	2.0
Grenada	Americas	5.5	7.5	3.5	2.1
Tajikistan	Asia	5.4	8.2	3.2	2.6
Albania	Europe	5.3	7.3	3.6	2.0
North Macedonia	Europe	5.2	8.8	2.4	3.7
Cambodia	Asia	5.2	7.7	3.1	2.5
Iraq	Asia	5.1	8.3	2.4	3.5
Haiti	Americas	5	8.5	2.2	3.9
Malaysia	Asia	5	8	2	4.0
Afghanistan	Asia	5	6.5	3.8	1.7
Timor-Leste	Asia	5	7.6	2.4	3.2
Panama	Americas	4.6	8.3	1.4	5.9
Barbados	Americas	4.5	8.8	1.1	8.0
Bangladesh	Asia	4.5	7.2	2.1	3.4
Libya	Africa	4.4	6.7	2.1	3.2
Laos	Asia	4.4	7.3	1.8	4.1
Tonga	Oceania	4.1	5.6	2.8	2.0
Myanmar	Asia	4.1	7.1	1.3	5.5
Greece	Europe	3.9	6.9	1.3	5.3
Cyprus	Europe	3.8	6.2	1.6	3.9
Sudan	Africa	3.7	5.5	2	2.8
Turkey	Europe	3.7	5.4	2.2	2.5
Armenia	Asia	3.7	8.1	0.7	11.6
Morocco	Africa	3.4	5.2	1.7	3.1
Maldives	Asia	3.3	5.1	0.9	5.7
Algeria	Africa	3.2	4.4	2	2.2
Philippines	Asia	3.1	5.4	1.1	4.9
Qatar	Asia	3	4.1	1.2	3.4
Brunei	Asia	3	4.6	1.5	3.1
Azerbaijan	Asia	3	5	1.5	3.3
Papua New Guinea	Oceania	2.9	3.7	2.1	1.8
Tunisia	Africa	2.9	4.3	1.7	2.5
Peru	Americas	2.9	4.2	1.6	2.6
Kuwait	Asia	2.8	3.5	1.6	2.2
United Arab Emirates	Asia	2.8	3.8	1.4	2.7
Bahrain	Asia	2.5	2.5	2.8	0.9
Bahamas	Americas	2.4	4.5	0.6	7.5
São Tomé and Príncipe	Africa	2.3	3.6	1.1	3.3
Indonesia	Asia	2.2	3.1	1.4	2.2
Saudi Arabia	Asia	2.2	2.9	1	2.9
Jamaica	Americas	2	3.8	0.5	7.6
Palestinian Authority	Asia	1.5	2.3	0.9	2.6
Antigua and Barbuda	Americas	1.4	1.6	0.9	1.8
Syria	Asia	1.4	2.3	0.5	4.6
Lebanon	Asia	1.2	1.7	0.8	2.1
Oman	Asia	1.1	1.7	0.3	5.7
Jordan	Asia	1.1	1.6	0.5	3.2
Egypt	Africa	0.8	1.3	0.4	3.3
Saint Vincent and the Grenadines	Americas	0.2	0.3	0	–

== Analysis ==
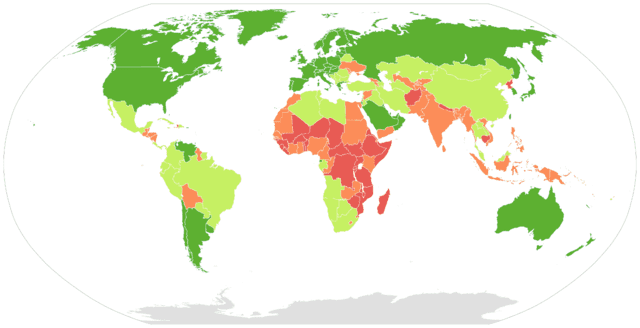
Deaths per million persons from self-inflicted injuries in 2012. Countries by income group.

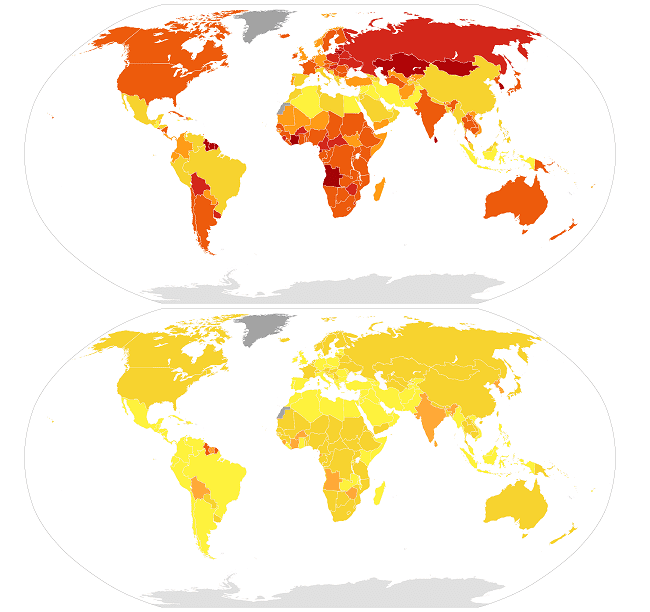
Age-standardized male (top) and female (bottom) suicide mortality rates per 100,000 (2015, WHO)

Suicide rates by income group in 2012 (per 100,000 people)
Income group (% of global pop)	Suicides, 2012 (in thousands)	Global %	Rate (2012)	Male:Female (2012)
High-income countries (18.3%)	197	24.5%	12.7	3.5 : 1
Upper-middle-income countries (34.3%)	192	23.8%	7.5	1.3 : 1
Lower-middle-income countries (35.4%)	333	41.4%	14.1	1.7 : 1
Low-income countries (12.0%)	82	10.2%	13.4	1.7 : 1
Global (100.0%)	804	100.0%	11.4	1.9 : 1

Male and female suicide rates are out of the total male population and total female population, respectively, i.e. total number of male suicides divided by the total male population. Age-standardized rates account for the influence that different population age distributions might have on the analysis of crude death rates, statistically addressing the prevailing trends by age-groups and populations' structures, to enhance long term cross-national comparability.

Based on age-groups' deviation from standardized population structures, rates are rounded up or down (age-adjustment). Basically, the presence of younger individuals in any given age structure carries more weight. If the rate is rounded up, that means the median age is lower than average for that region or country, and vice versa when rounded down.

Most countries listed above report a higher male suicide rate. Worldwide, there are about 3 male suicides out of 4, or a factor of 3:1. For example, the ratio in the United States was 3.36 in 2015, and 3.53 in 2016. (Note: The male-female ratio shown below is based on the age-standardized rates: as compared to WHO world standard population, women's median age and life expectancy might be greater than that of men's for that country when rounded up, and vice versa when rounded down.)

Though age-standardization is common statistical process to categorize mortality data for comparing purposes, this approach by WHO is based on estimates which take into account issues such as under-reporting, resulting in rates differing from the official national statistics prepared and endorsed by individual countries. Revisions are also performed periodically. Age-adjusted rates are mortality rates that would have existed if all populations under study had the same age distribution as a "standard" population. Plain, crude estimated rates are available at here and here. Countries with a population less than 100 000 are excluded.

Countries with large internal discrepancies are complicated to assess. Canada, a country with a comparatively low suicide rate overall at 10.3 incidents per 100,000 people in 2016, exhibits one such discrepancy. When comparing the suicide rate of Indigenous peoples in Canada, the rate of suicide increases to 24.3 incidents per 100,000 people in 2016, a rate among the ten highest in the world. There are numerous differences in living standards and income that contribute to this phenomenon, classed as an epidemic in Canada.

== List by other sources and years (1985–2023) ==
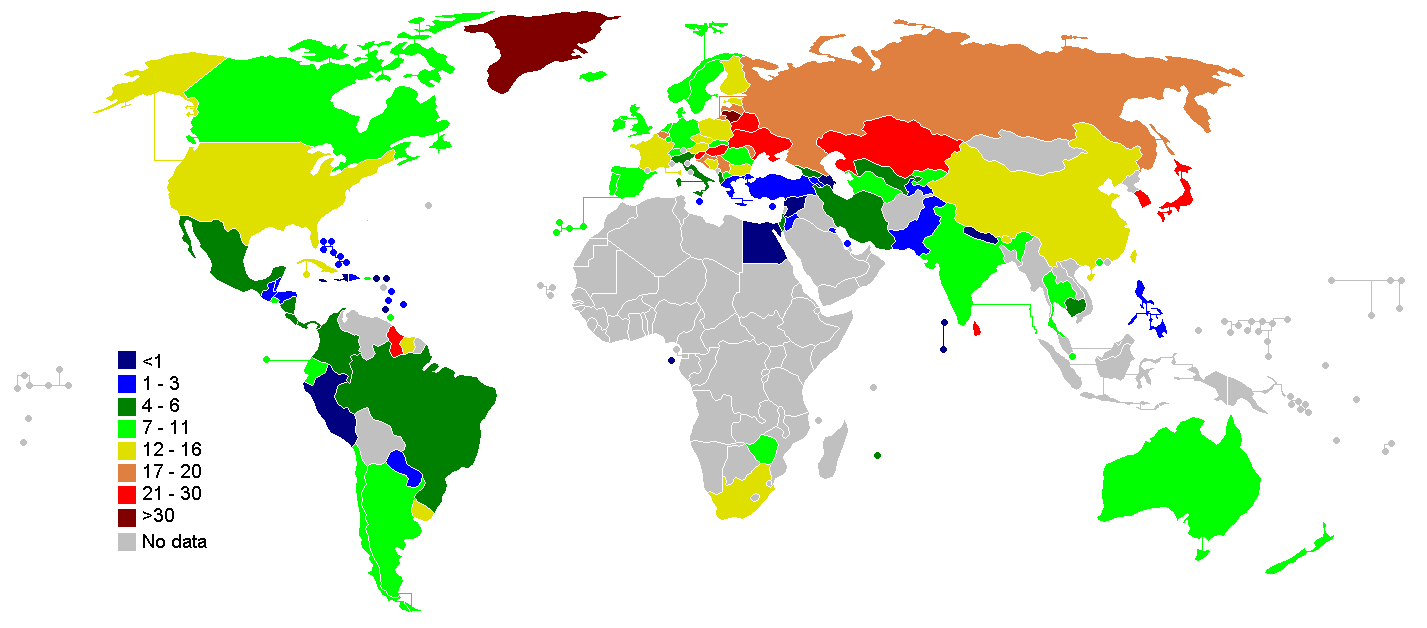
Global suicide rates per 100,000 people, 1978–2009.

In the list below various sources from various years are included, mixing plain crude rates with age-adjusted rates and estimated rates, so cross-national comparability is somewhat skewed.

* indicates "Suicide in COUNTRY or TERRITORY" or "Mental Health in COUNTRY or TERRITORY" links.

Suicides per 100,000 people per year
Country or Territory	Male	Female	Overall	Sources and year
Greenland * (Danish Realm)	75.08	25.18	53.34	2019
Lithuania *	32.2	6.7	18.6	2022
South Korea *	35.9	16.2	26.0	2021
Guyana *	41.25	10.20	25.52	2017
Kazakhstan *	40.68	8.01	23.81	2017
Slovenia			18.09	2016
Sri Lanka *			14.6	2018
Hungary			17.98	2016
Belarus *			20.5	2017
Taiwan (estimate) (Note: Nevertheless, jumping from a high building as well as drowning were common methods of suicide in Taiwan, (Note: In government's annual release, there were 3637 people per one hundred thousands of people in 2018 died of contacting poison, accidental fall, exposure to fire or smoke, accidental drowning including sinking beneath water to death in addition to the suicidal death that was equal to 3865 people per 100,000 people.) indicating the potential risks of type I and type II errors and misuse of statistics within the government's report. Hence, if halves of the death rates of the drowning and fall that were shown in government's report were extracted and added into the self-inflicted deaths (intentional injury death of self), it yields 0.0201% which is thought better reflecting the real case.)			20.1	2018
Ukraine *			22.4	2016
Uruguay *	37.2	9.9	23.3	2022
Latvia			18.56	2016
Moldova			15.9	2016
Serbia			13.52	2016
Belgium			17.0	2016 (Note: Recently released figures by official Belgian authorities suggest a considerably higher rate of 17.0 persons (total) per 100,000 people per annum in 2009 (5,712 cases in a population of 10,749,000 (=10,666,866 as of 1 January 2008 increasing by 0,77% per annum.) as of 1 January 2009)."Toenemend aantal zelfdodingen in Belgie" (in Dutch). 2011.) (Note: The number of death in Belgium in 2008 due to suicide "zichzelf schade toebrengen" was reported at 2000 out of a total of 103.760 death. These death comprise 1453 men and 547 women. This puts the suicide rate at about 19 per 100.000. See statbel: http://statbel.fgov.be/nl/binaries/NL%20-%20Tableau%201%2E3_T_2008_tcm325-168456.pdf)
Japan *	23.1	10.1	16.5	2018
Taiwan (government data) (Note: Furthermore, jumping from a high building as well as drowning were common methods of suicide in Taiwan. (Note: In government's annual release, there were 3637 people per one hundred thousands people in 2018 died of contacting poison, accidental fall, exposure to fire or smoke, accidental drowning, or sinking beneath water that were excluded from the statistical suicidal death figure equal to 3865 people per 100,000 people.))	21.0	11.6	16.2	2022
Croatia			16	2016
Bhutan *			12.16	2017
Austria	23.8	7.1	13.69	2016
South Africa *			15.4	2005
Estonia			14.31	2016
France *			13.72	2023
Suriname	23.9	4.8	14.4	2005
Finland *	22.3	6.9	14.26	2016
European Union			10.33	2016
United States *	21.8	6.0	14.5	2017
Poland			12.28	2016
Russia *			13.7	2017
Bosnia and Herzegovina			13.6	2012
Czech Republic			11.4	2020
Germany			11.29	2016
Cuba	19.0	5.5	12.3	2008
Bulgaria			9.24	2016
New Zealand	19.0	5.8	12.3	2014–15
Hong Kong *	16.2	8.8	12.3	2011
Sweden *			11.73	2016
Portugal			8.95	2016
Romania *			10.13	2016
Norway			12.08	2016
United Kingdom *			11.2	2018
Canada *	16.9	5.3	11.5	2009
Iceland			12.3	2016
Chile	18.2	4.2	11.2	2007
Switzerland *	17	5.8	11.2	2011
Netherlands	18.0	6.0	12.0	2015
Trinidad and Tobago	17.9	3.8	10.7	2006
India *	13.0	7.8	10.5	2009
Ireland	17.4	3.4	10.3	2013
Singapore *	13.3	7.3	10.3	2012
Australia *	20.1	6.3	13.1	2019
Slovakia			7.48	2016
China *			9.8	2014
Venezuela			9.5	2019
Kyrgyzstan	14.1	3.6	8.8	2009
Turkmenistan	13.8	3.5	8.6	1998
Spain *	12.7	4.1	8.3	2013
North Macedonia	12.6	3.9	8.0	2009
El Salvador	12.9	3.6	8.0	2008
Italy	12.7	3.8	8.0	2016
Zimbabwe	10.6	5.2	7.9	1990
Luxembourg	13.2	2.9	7.8	2008
Argentina	12.6	3.0	9.8	2024
Ecuador	10.5	3.6	7.1	2009
Mauritius	11.8	1.9	6.8	2008
Costa Rica	10.2	1.9	6.1	2009
Thailand	9.7	2.58	6.03	2013
Mongolia	8.6	3.1	5.85	2011
Israel	9.9	2.1	5.8	2007
Nicaragua	9.0	2.6	5.8	2006
Panama	9.0	1.9	5.5	2008
Turkey	6.34	1.90	4.12	2019
Colombia	7.9	2.0	4.9	2007
Brazil *	7.7	2.0	4.8	2008
Uzbekistan	7.0	2.3	4.7	2005
Cambodia			4.6	2008
Georgia	7.1	1.7	4.3	2009
Albania	4.7	3.3	4.0	2003
Mexico *	6.8	1.3	4.0	2008
Honduras			3.84	2011
Bahrain	4.0	3.5	3.8	2006
Belize	6.6	0.7	3.7	2008
Saint Vincent and the Grenadines	5.4	1.9	3.7	2008
Paraguay	5.1	2.0	3.6	2008
Cyprus	5.9	1.3	3.6	2009
Guatemala	5.6	1.7	3.6	2008
Barbados	7.3	0.0	3.5	2006
Greece *	6.1	1.0	3.5	2009
Malta	5.9	1.0	3.4	2008
Iran *	3.9	2.1	3.4	2013
Philippines	4.5	1.0	2.75	2005
Tajikistan	2.9	2.3	2.6	2001
Saint Lucia	4.9	0.0	2.4	2005
Dominican Republic	3.9	0.7	2.3	2005
Armenia	2.8	1.1	1.9	2008
Kuwait	1.9	1.7	1.8	2009
Bahamas	1.9	0.6	1.2	2005
Pakistan *	1.45	0.71	1.10	2012
Peru	1.1	0.6	0.9	2000
São Tomé and Príncipe	0.0	1.8	0.9	1987
Azerbaijan	1.0	0.3	0.6	2007
Maldives	0.7	0.0	0.3	2005
Jamaica	0.3	0.0	0.1	1990
Syria	0.2	0.0	0.1	1985
Jordan	0.2	0.0	0.1	2008
Egypt	0.1	0.0	0.1	2009
Grenada	0.0	0.0	0.0	2008
Saint Kitts and Nevis	0.0	0.0	0.0	1995
Antigua and Barbuda	0.0	0.0	0.0	1995
Haiti	0.0	0.0	0.0	2003
Nepal *	0.0	0.0	0.0	2003

== See also ==
- Epidemiology of suicide
- Gender differences in suicide
- Suicide in the military
- List of countries by intentional death rate
- List of countries by intentional homicide rate
- List of countries by life expectancy
- List of suicide crisis lines

== Explanatory notes ==
- The updated figure of suicide rates in Belgium for 2011 is 2,084 with a total population of 10,933,607, equivalent to 18.96 per 100,000 inhabitants (source: Het Nieuwsblad, 10 April 2014).
- Taiwan is not a member of the WHO. The Taiwanese government adopted the WHO standard in 2007. According to the Taiwanese government's self-released data, the figure is standardized based upon the population within Taiwan.
