= List of countries by intentional death rate =

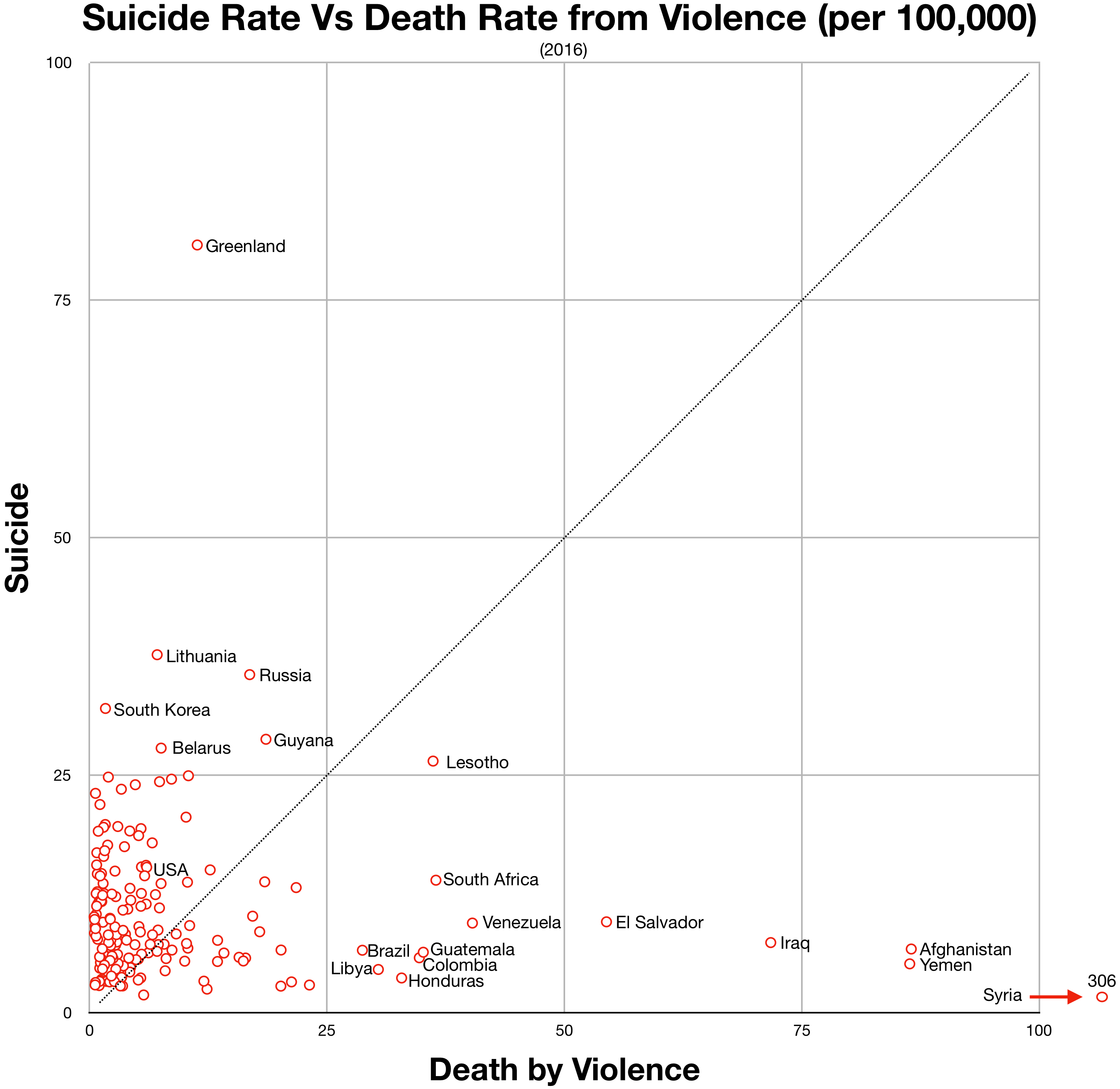
Suicide vs violent deaths 2016

The following list of countries by intentional death rate has been obtained by adding the suicide rate from the World Health Organization and the homicide rate from the UNODC United Nations Office on Drugs and Crime (UNODC) Study. Intentional deaths include homicide (intentional injury death of another) and suicide (intentional injury death of self).

== Definition ==
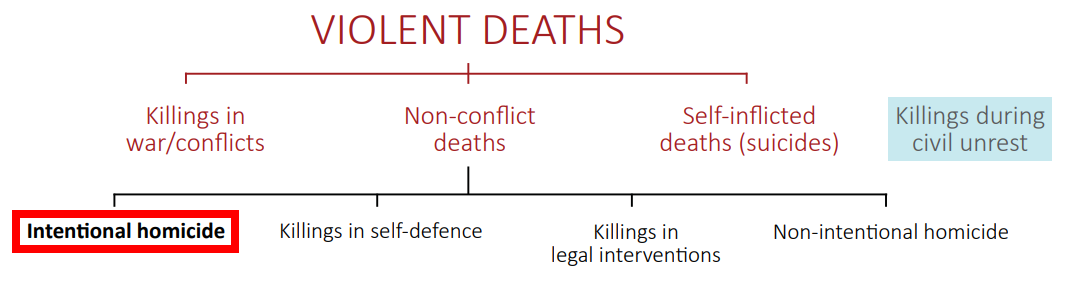
The class of violent deaths documented in this article is intentional killing of others outside of war. Deaths occurring during situations of civil unrest are a grey area.

Intentional homicide is defined by the United Nations Office on Drugs and Crime (UNODC) in its Global Study on Homicide report thus:

Within the broad range of violent deaths, the core element of intentional homicide is the complete liability of the direct perpetrator, which thus excludes killings directly related to war or conflicts, self-inflicted death (suicide), killings due to legal interventions or justifiable killings (such as self-defence), and those deaths caused when the perpetrator was reckless or negligent but did not intend to take a human life (non-intentional homicide).

Though some discrepancies exist in how specific categories of intentional killings are classified, the definitions used by countries to record data are generally close to the UNODC definition, making the homicide rates highly comparable at the international level. UNODC uses the homicide rate as a proxy for overall violence, as this type of crime is one of the most accurately reported and internationally comparable indicators.

Figures from the Global Study on Homicide are based on the UNODC Homicide Statistics dataset, which is derived from the criminal justice or public health systems of a variety of countries and territories. The homicide rates derived from criminal justice data (typically recorded by police authorities) and the public health system data (recorded when the cause of death is established) may diverge substantially for some countries. The two sources usually match in the Americas, Europe and Oceania, but there are large discrepancies for the three African countries reporting both sources. For the 70 countries in which neither source was made available, figures were derived from WHO statistical models.

Deaths resulting from an armed conflict between states are never included in the count. Killings caused by a non-international armed conflict may or may not be included, depending on the intensity of hostilities and whether it is classified as 'civil unrest' or a clash between organized armed groups.

== List of countries by intentional death rate ==
Intentional deaths per 100,000 people per year
Country	Intentional Death	Homicide	Suicide	Ratio (H:S)
Lesotho	131.1	43.6	87.5	0.50
Greenland (more info)	65.5	5.3	60.2	0.09
Guyana (more info)	60.9	20.0	40.9	0.49
South Africa	57.0	33.5	23.5	1.43
Eswatini	52.1	11.6	40.5	0.29
U.S. Virgin Islands	49.3	49.3	N/A	N/A
Jamaica	47.0	44.7	2.3	19.43
El Salvador	43.3	37.2	6.1	6.10
Central African Republic	43.1	20.1	23.0	6.10
Nigeria	41.4	34.5	6.9	0.87
Honduras	38.9	36.3	2.6	13.96
Trinidad and Tobago	38.9	30.6	8.3	3.69
Venezuela	38.8	36.7	2.1	17.48
Saint Vincent and the Grenadines	37.5	36.5	1.0	36.50
Saint Kitts and Nevis	36.1	36.1	0.0	N/A
Botswana	35.4	15.2	20.2	0.75
Mexico	33.7	28.4	5.3	5.36
Belize	33.4	25.7	7.7	3.34
Suriname	31.3	5.4	25.9	0.21
Zimbabwe	31.1	7.5	23.6	0.32
Uruguay	30.9	12.1	18.8	0.64
Kiribati	30.6	N/A	30.6	N/A
Micronesia	29.0	N/A	29.0	N/A
Russia (more info)	28.9	7.3	21.6	0.34
Guatemala	28.7	22.5	6.2	3.63
Anguilla	28.3	28.3	N/A	N/A
Saint Lucia	28.3	21.4	6.9	3.10
Saint Martin	27.7	27.7	N/A	N/A
Brazil	27.3	20.9	6.4	3.27
Mozambique	26.7	3.5	23.2	0.15
Colombia	26.3	22.6	3.7	6.11
Puerto Rico	25.9	18.5	7.4	2.50
Namibia	25.4	11.9	13.5	0.88
Mongolia	24.0	6.0	18.0	0.33
Yemen	23.9	6.8	7.1	0.96
Ukraine (more info)	23.9	6.2	17.7	0.35
Lithuania (more info)	23.9	3.7	20.2	0.18
The Bahamas	22.0	18.6	3.4	5.47
South Korea (more info)	21.8	0.6	21.2	0.03
Cape Verde	21.7	6.5	15.2	0.43
South Sudan	21.6	14.9	6.7	2.22
Kazakhstan (more info)	21.3	3.2	18.1	0.18
Vanuatu	21.0	N/A	21.0	N/A
Dominica	20.8	20.8	N/A	N/A
United States (more info)	20.8	6.3	14.5	0.43
Montserrat	20.3	20.3	N/A	N/A
Uganda	20.1	9.7	10.4	0.93
Zambia	19.8	5.4	14.4	0.38
Montenegro	19.1	2.9	16.2	0.18
Curaçao	19.0	19.0	N/A	N/A
Belarus	18.9	2.4	16.5	0.15
Costa Rica	18.8	11.2	7.6	1.47
Latvia	18.7	2.6	16.1	0.16
Ethiopia	18.3	8.8	9.5	0.93
Burundi	18.2	6.1	12.1	0.50
Haiti	17.9	6.7	11.2	0.59
Angola	17.4	4.8	12.6	0.38
Solomon Islands	17.4	N/A	17.4	N/A
Cameroon	17.3	1.4	15.9	0.09
Eritrea	17.3	N/A	17.3	N/A
Seychelles	17.1	12.5	4.6	2.72
Moldova	16.3	4.1	12.2	0.34
India (more info)	15.9	3.0	12.9	0.23
Saint Pierre and Miquelon	15.8	15.8	N/A	N/A
Burkina Faso	15.7	1.3	14.4	0.09
Ivory Coast	15.7	N/A	15.7	N/A
Belgium	15.6	1.7	13.9	0.12
Ecuador	15.5	7.8	7.7	1.01
Sri Lanka(more info)	15.3	2.4	12.9	0.19
Estonia	15.3	3.2	12.0	0.27
Cuba	15.2	5.0	10.2	0.49
Kenya	15.0	4.0	11.0	0.36
Finland	15.0	1.6	13.4	0.12
Hong Kong	14.9	0.3	14.6	0.02
Iraq	14.8	10.1	4.7	2.15
Togo	14.8	N/A	14.8	N/A
Tanzania	14.7	6.5	8.2	0.79
Somalia	14.7	N/A	14.7	N/A
Samoa	14.6	N/A	14.6	N/A
Niger	14.5	4.4	10.1	0.44
Slovenia	14.5	0.5	14.0	0.04
Dominican Republic	14.0	8.9	5.1	1.75
Panama	14.0	11.1	2.9	3.83
Benin	13.8	1.1	12.7	0.09
Pakistan	13.7	3.9	9.8	0.40
Sweden	13.6	1.2	12.4	0.10
Guinea-Bissau	13.5	1.1	12.4	0.09
Equatorial Guinea	13.5	N/A	13.5	N/A
Argentina	13.4	5.3	8.1	0.65
French Guiana	13.2	13.2	N/A	N/A
Chad	13.2	N/A	13.2	N/A
Gabon	13.1	N/A	13.1	N/A
Bolivia	13.0	6.2	6.8	0.91
Sierra Leone	13.0	1.7	11.3	0.15
Paraguay	12.9	6.7	6.2	1.08
New Zealand	12.9	2.6	10.3	0.25
Afghanistan	12.7	6.7	6.0	1.12
Iceland	12.7	1.5	11.2	0.13
Ghana	12.6	2.1	10.5	0.20
Hungary	12.6	0.8	11.8	0.07
Japan (more info)	12.5	0.3	12.2	0.02
Chile	12.4	4.4	8.0	0.55
Malawi	12.4	1.8	10.6	0.17
Norway	12.4	0.6	11.8	0.05
DR Congo	12.4	N/A	12.4	N/A
Canada (more info)	12.3	2.0	10.3	0.19
Guinea	12.3	N/A	12.3	N/A
Australia	12.2	0.9	11.3	0.08
Rwanda	12.1	2.6	9.5	0.27
Nepal	12.1	2.3	9.8	0.23
Croatia	12.0	1.0	11.0	0.09
Nicaragua	11.9	7.2	4.7	1.53
Djibouti	11.9	N/A	11.9	N/A
Mauritius	11.7	2.9	8.8	0.33
Congo	11.6	N/A	11.6	N/A
Antigua and Barbuda	11.4	11.1	0.3	37.00
Grenada	11.4	10.8	0.6	18.00
Senegal	11.3	0.3	11.0	0.03
Austria	11.1	0.7	10.4	0.07
France (more info)	10.9	1.2	9.7	0.12
Liberia	10.7	3.3	7.4	0.45
Peru	10.6	7.9	2.7	2.93
Thailand	10.6	2.6	8.0	0.33
Kyrgyzstan	10.5	2.2	8.3	0.27
Slovakia	10.5	1.2	9.3	0.13
Turkmenistan	10.3	4.2	6.1	0.69
Switzerland	10.3	0.5	9.8	0.05
Czech Republic	10.2	0.7	9.5	0.07
Barbados	10.1	9.8	0.3	32.67
Poland	10.0	0.7	9.3	0.08
Sudan	9.9	5.1	4.8	1.06
Georgia	9.9	2.2	7.7	0.29
Macedonia	9.9	1.9	8.0	0.24
Netherlands	9.9	0.6	9.3	0.06
Singapore	9.9	0.2	9.7	0.02
Ireland	9.6	0.7	8.9	0.08
Gambia	9.6	N/A	9.6	N/A
Bosnia and Herzegovina	9.5	1.2	8.3	0.14
Fiji	9.5	N/A	9.5	N/A
Uzbekistan	9.4	1.1	8.3	0.13
Madagascar	9.2	N/A	9.2	N/A
Germany	9.1	0.8	8.3	0.10
Serbia	8.9	1.0	7.9	0.13
Romania	8.8	1.5	7.3	0.21
Luxembourg	8.8	0.2	8.6	0.02
Vietnam	8.7	1.5	7.2	0.21
East Timor	8.6	4.1	4.5	0.91
Morocco	8.6	1.3	7.3	0.18
Denmark	8.6	1.0	7.6	0.13
Comoros	8.5	N/A	8.5	N/A
North Macedonia	8.4	1.2	7.2	0.17
British Virgin Islands	8.3	8.3	N/A	N/A
Cayman Islands	8.2	8.2	N/A	N/A
North Korea	8.2	N/A	8.2	N/A
Bermuda	8.1	8.1	N/A	N/A
United Kingdom (more info)	8.1	1.2	6.9	0.17
Portugal	8.1	0.9	7.2	0.13
Tunisia	8.0	4.8	3.2	1.50
Mali	8.0	N/A	8.0	N/A
Malaysia	7.9	2.1	5.8	0.36
Bahrain	7.7	0.5	7.2	0.07
Iran	7.6	2.5	5.1	0.49
Bhutan	7.6	2.5	5.1	0.49
Bulgaria	7.5	1.0	6.5	0.15
Cambodia	7.3	1.8	5.5	0.33
China (more info)	7.2	0.5	6.7	0.07
Philippines	6.9	4.4	2.5	1.76
Malta	6.9	1.6	5.3	0.30
Israel	6.7	1.5	5.2	0.29
Saudi Arabia	6.7	1.3	5.4	0.24
Bangladesh	6.3	2.4	3.9	0.62
Azerbaijan	6.3	2.3	4.0	0.58
Tajikistan	6.2	0.9	5.3	0.17
Egypt	6.0	2.6	3.4	0.76
Laos	6.0	N/A	6.0	N/A
Mayotte	5.9	5.9	N/A	N/A
Spain	5.9	0.6	5.3	0.11
Guadeloupe	5.8	5.8	N/A	N/A
Albania	5.8	2.1	3.7	0.57
Turks and Caicos Islands	5.7	5.7	N/A	N/A
United Arab Emirates	5.7	0.5	5.2	0.10
São Tomé and Príncipe	5.5	3.3	2.2	1.5
Mauritania	5.5	N/A	5.5	N/A
Myanmar	5.3	2.3	3.0	0.77
Qatar	5.1	0.4	4.7	0.09
Turkey	4.9	2.6	2.3	1.13
Italy	4.8	0.5	4.3	0.12
Oman	4.8	0.3	4.5	0.07
Lebanon	4.7	1.9	2.8	0.68
Kuwait	4.5	1.8	2.7	0.67
Armenia	4.5	1.8	2.7	0.67
Libya	4.5	N/A	4.5	N/A
Cyprus	4.4	1.2	3.2	0.38
Greece	4.4	0.8	3.6	0.22
Tonga	4.4	N/A	4.4	N/A
Algeria	3.9	1.3	2.6	0.50
Papua New Guinea	3.6	N/A	3.6	N/A
Maldives	3.5	0.7	2.8	0.25
Gibraltar	3.0	3.0	N/A	N/A
Jordan	3.0	1.0	2.0	0.50
Syria	3.0	0.9	2.1	0.43
Brunei	3.0	0.5	2.5	0.20
Indonesia	3.0	0.4	2.6	0.15
Martinique	2.8	2.8	N/A	N/A
Andorra	2.6	2.6	N/A	N/A
Liechtenstein	2.6	2.6	N/A	N/A
Kosovo	2.4	2.4	N/A	N/A
Kurdistan	2.2	2.2	N/A	N/A
Aruba	1.9	1.9	N/A	N/A
Réunion	1.8	1.8	N/A	N/A
Palestine	1.0	1.0	N/A	N/A
Taiwan	0.8	0.8	N/A	N/A
Macau	0.3	0.3	N/A	N/A
Channel Islands	0.0	0.0	N/A	N/A
Holy See	0.0	0.0	N/A	N/A
Isle of Man	0.0	0.0	N/A	N/A
Monaco	0.0	0.0	N/A	N/A
Saint Helena	0.0	0.0	N/A	N/A
San Marino	0.0	0.0	N/A	N/A

== See also ==
- List of countries by intentional homicide rate
- List of countries by suicide rate
- List of countries by life expectancy

== Sources ==
- Global Study on Homicide 2013: Trends, Contexts, Data (PDF). Vienna: United Nations Office on Drugs and Crime. March 2014. ISBN 9789210542050.
