= Suicide in South Africa =

Suicide in South Africa is a public health and social problem that contributes to premature mortality and disability, particularly among young people and men. National estimates and international modelling indicate that South Africa experiences approximately 14,000 deaths from intentional self-harm each year, though official recorded figures are often lower due to under-reporting. As reported in 2024, the country's estimated suicide rate is 23.5 per 100,000, while the WHO's most recent age standardized rate for 2021 is 22.3 per 100,000.

== Background ==
Suicide is among the leading causes of death for adolescents and young adults in South Africa, and has been highlighted in multiple national and regional reports as a priority for mental health policy and prevention efforts. National registration data are used by Statistics South Africa to report deaths due to intentional self-harm (suicide) and related external causes.

== Helplines ==
- Lifeline South Africa
- South African Depression and Anxiety Group (SADAG)
- Netcare Akeso Crisis Line
- Childline South Africa – established for children and minors, but its counselling services are available to people of all ages.

== Statistics ==
- In 2019, South Africa recorded an estimated 13,774 suicide deaths (10,861 males and 2,913 females).
- WHO reported South Africa's 2019 age standardised suicide rate at about 11 per 100,000.
- National data from Statistics South Africa show that suicide has consistently been among the top 20 causes of non-natural deaths in the country.

== Risk factors ==
=== Gender ===
Men in South Africa die by suicide at a rate of 75% higher than women. Women, however, are more likely to attempt suicide or present with non-fatal self-harm.

=== Urban–rural differences ===
Rural areas often report higher suicide rates than urban centres, partly linked to social isolation, firearm access, and lower availability of mental health services.

=== Alcohol and substance use ===
Post-mortem and epidemiological studies show a strong correlation between alcohol consumption and suicide in South Africa, particularly among young adults.

=== Age ===
Adolescents and young adults (15–29) are at higher risk, but suicide also affects middle-aged and older men disproportionately.

=== Unemployment ===
Periods of high unemployment and poverty have been linked with elevated suicide rates, especially among working-age men.

== Mitigation efforts ==
South Africa has introduced suicide-prevention and mental-health policies, including proposed national strategies.

These focus on:

- Improving access to mental-health care
- Community-based prevention programs
- Reducing stigma
- Restricting access to lethal means

== See also ==
- Mental health in South Africa
- Stransham-Ford v Minister of Justice
- Healthcare in South Africa
