= Health in Lithuania =

Overview of health indicators and the healthcare system in Lithuania

Development in Lithuania

As of 2023 Lithuanian life expectancy at birth was 77.43 years (72.86 years for males and 81.71 years for females) and the infant mortality rate was 2.8 per 1,000 live births. Both indicators remain below the EU and OECD average.

cardiovascular disease were the leading cause of death in 2023 (52.1%) accounting for 52.1% of all deaths, followed by cancers (21%) and external causes (6.1%). Taken together, these categories represent approximately four-fifths of all mortality. The mortality rate from external causes among males is the highest in the European Union. Especially the suicide rates in Lithuania remain the largest in whole of Europe, the EU, and at times had been the worst in the OECD, comparing among worst in the world nations like South Korea, South Africa, Uruguay, etc. It has been a subject of intense research, especially after a dramatic rise of losses of life in the 1990s. The suicide rate has been constantly decreasing since and, as of 2023, is reported at 1.95 per 10,000 people.

In 2018, Lithuania ranked 28th in Europe in the Euro health consumer index, which assesses healthcare systems based on waiting times, outcomes, and other indicators. Healthcare institutions are the top employers in the country, but still remain overstretched, with long wait times and insufficient funding for specialists and medicine for ever increasing traffic of patients and numbers of intervention requiring cases. Roughly one-third of all the care is privately funded (by the patients themselves or on their behalf), which is strongly above the EU average of twenty percent.

== Healthcare ==
After independence in 1918 a health care system based on the Bismarck model began to develop. In 1949, when it was absorbed into the USSR, it was reorganized according to the centralised Semashko system. It was relatively well funded and the population's health status was better than in other parts of the USSR. Lithuania moved away from a system funded mainly by local and state budgets to a mixed system, predominantly funded by the National Health Insurance Fund in the late 1990s. The deterioration in health which occurred during the first phase of social reforms was halted in 1994 and the standardized death rate decreased from 12.06 (per 1000 population) in 1994 to 10.16 in 1998.

The National Health Concept was adopted in 1991 by the Supreme Council – Reconstituent Seimas. It introduced health insurance, and prioritised disease prevention and primary care. In 1998 the Lithuanian Health Programme was adopted by the Seimas. This set as priorities the reduction of mortality and increased life expectancy, improvements in the quality of life, and increases in health equity. The National Health Insurance Fund was established.

By 2000 the vast majority of Lithuanian health care institutions were non-profit-making enterprises and a private sector developed, providing mostly outpatient services which are paid for out-of-pocket. The Ministry of Health also runs a few health care facilities and is involved in the running of the two major Lithuanian teaching hospitals. In 2012 there were 52 fewer hospitals than there had been in 1990. There were 66 general hospitals, 26 secondary hospitals, 49 nursing hospitals, and 4 rehabilitation hospitals. The ministry is responsible for the State Public Health Centre which manages the public health network including ten county public health centres with their local branches. The ten counties run the county hospitals and specialised health care facilities.

Total expenditure on healthcare per head of the population was $1,579 in 2013, 6.2% of GDP. There were 12,191 physicians in the country in 2009, 36.14 per 100,000 population.

There is now Compulsory Health Insurance for Lithuanian residents. There are 5 Territorial Health Insurance Funds, covering Vilnius, Kaunas, Klaipėda, Šiauliai and Panevėžys. Contributions for people who are economically active are 9% of income. In 2016 225,510 people, about 8% of the population, had not paid their contributions to the National Health Insurance fund, but it was thought many were actually not in the country. The insurance scheme does not cover adult dentistry or, for most people, outpatient prescription medicines. Only about 1% take out additional voluntary health insurance.

Emergency medical services are provided free of charge to all residents. Access to hospital treatment is normally by referral by a General Practitioner. Prescribable medicines are listed in the Lithuanian State Medicines Register.

== See also ==
- Ministry of Health (Lithuania)
- Suicide in Lithuania
- COVID-19 pandemic in Lithuania
- Health in Latvia
