= Domestic violence in Lithuania =

Domestic violence in Lithuania is a pervasive social problem.

The Law on Protection against Domestic Violence came into force in 2011. In the four months after the law took effect, Lithuanian police received over 10,000 reports of domestic violence and initiated 3,300 investigations.

== Legal framework ==
Acts of violence within the family can be charged under the Law on Protection against Domestic Violence. Before the 2011 law, domestic violence (DV) could be prosecuted only under general laws (such as assault based offenses from the Criminal Code).

The 2011 DV law covers people living in a "domestic environment". The law states that: "Domestic environment shall mean the environment comprising the persons currently or previously linked by marriage, partnership, affinity or other close relations, also the persons having a common domicile and a common household."

== Specific issues ==
=== Child abuse ===
Child abuse in Lithuania is often fueled by parental alcohol abuse. Following its independence, Lithuania has been slow to address the issue of child abuse, with the country being slow to change the approaches of the former Soviet regime, and conservative ideologies about the place of children in the family and society remaining strong.

Children are legally protected from abuse. Under the 2011 law, the definition of "victim of domestic violence" includes "a child who has become a witness of domestic violence or lives in an environment exposed to violence".

=== Sexual violence within the family ===
Sexual violence in the family includes forced sex and child sexual abuse (CSA).

CSA is illegal in Lithuania, and in 2010 the country tightened penalties for child molestation and raised the age of consent from 14 to 16.

The definition of Rape (Article 149) can, theoretically, be applied to marital rape because the law does not exclude marital rape and it does not allow marriage as a defense for rape, so this can be construed to include rape within a marriage. The 2011 DV law stipulates that violence against family members can be sexual (along with physical, mental, economic) but does not define what sexual violence in the family is, and it does not make any specific reference to marital rape. While, in theory, both the rape law and the DV law can be constructed to include forced sex between spouses, there are reports that these laws are not enforced by the courts in this way, and that the concept of marital rape is not understood by the Lithuanian society which is conservative.

=== Social views ===
In the 2010 Eurobarometer poll on violence against women, 28% of Lithuanian respondents said that they thought DV in their country was "very common", 52% "fairly common", 15% "not very common", 1% "not at all common", and 4% did not know/did not answer. The poll found that in Lithuania the population holds strong victim blaming attitudes: 86% of Lithuanian respondents agreed that the "provocative behaviour of women" was a cause of violence against women - the highest percentage of all countries surveyed, significantly higher than the European average of 52%. In the same poll, 48% of Lithuanian respondents said that they knew women among their circle of friends and family who had been victims of DV - again the highest percentage of all countries surveyed (European average 25%).

== Social background ==
Following its independence, Lithuania has struggled, experiencing poverty, unemployment, and social unrest; and this has had a negative effect on family life and on personal wellbeing. Suicide in Lithuania has become a serious national problem, due to its very high prevalence. During 2005-2007/2008-2010 Lithuania also had the highest murder rate in the European Union.

== International incidents ==
In 2013, a Lithuanian woman who was a victim of DV won her case against the State of Lithuania at the European Court of Human Rights, which ruled that Lithuania had failed to provide her with adequate protection.
