= Mental health in Somalia =

Mental health services have been described as non-existent in Somalia

Somalia has been described as having one of the world's highest rates of mental illness, with one in three Somalis meeting the diagnostic threshold for some form of mental illness. This has been attributed to the ongoing Somali Civil War, political instability, and natural disasters. Despite the high prevalence of mental illness among the Somali population, mental health services are almost non-existent in Somalia.

== Mental health services and treatment ==
=== Colonial period ===
During the colonial period, several psychiatric facilities were built.

=== Contemporary ===
In recent history, mental health services have consistently been neglected by government-run healthcare facilities. The Somali government spends less than 1% of its health budget on mental health services. There are currently 0.5 psychiatric beds for every 100,000 people in Somalia's hospitals.

== Views on mental illness ==
In Somalia, mental illness is often attributed to causes such as spirit possession, witchcraft and evil eye. As a result, treatment may include exorcism and reciting verses from the Quran.

Individuals with serious mental health problems are often kept in chains.

== Suicide and self-harm ==
Despite having one of the highest rates of mental illness in the world, Somalia's suicide rate is lower than the global average. It has been found that suicide and self-harm are more prevalent among Somali males than females.
