= Higher Health =

South African government agency

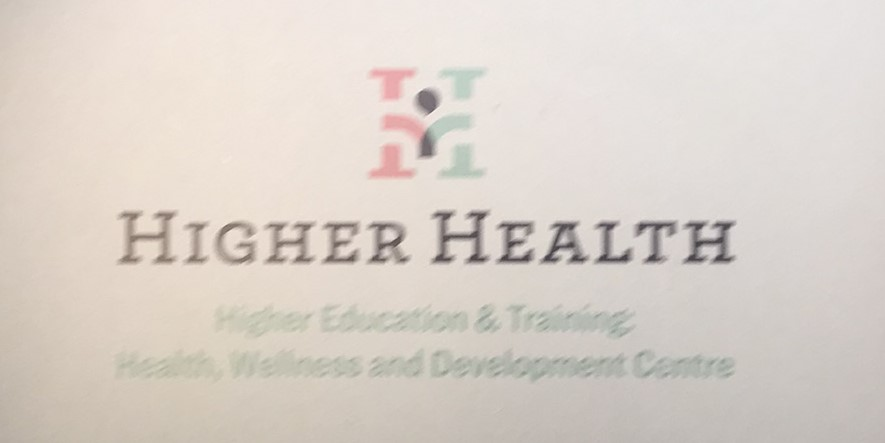
- Close-up of the Higher Health office door

Agency overview
- Formed: January 1, 2000
- Headquarters: 262 Rose Avenue, Wild Olive, Riverfalls Office Park, Centurion
- Agency executive: Dr Ramneek Ahluwalia, Chief Executive Officer (CEO)
- Website: higherhealth.ac.za

Higher Health addresses the health and well-being of students in South Africa. Previously known as Higher Education and Training HIV/AIDS Programme (HEAIDS), Higher Health acts as an implementing agency for the Department of Higher Education and Training (DHET). In universities, Higher Health offers financial and technical support to all public universities to implement a comprehensive health and psychosocial programme based on their model of health promotion. Under the governance of Universities South Africa, this agency seeks to address the complex social issues and healthcare needs facing those in post school education.

== Partnerships ==
Apart from partnerships with 26 public universities, 50 TVET colleges, and 9 CET colleges, Higher Health has a complex array of partnerships with DHET, the Department of Health, the National Skills Fund (NSF), the Global Fund, the European Union (EU), and other private sector and civil society organisations across South Africa.

== Overall well-being ==
Higher Health's remit is to address the healthcare needs of 2.5 million young South Africans in post-school education. Many young people delay (or abandon) the completion of their studies due to a range of different stressors. Whether it be economic hardship - 50% of the economically active proportion of the population (aged 15 to 24) are unemployed. Or political instability, that interrupts a program from start to finish and prevents the completion of an educational process. These are some of the many factors that contribute towards depression and/or anxiety.

The situation facing graduates is not much better. Of the 1 million people who exit post-school education every year, only 20% of graduates find employment within the year. Another 20% find employment later on. But 60% remain without a formal work. The cumulative effects of under employment are both felt by the individual (depression, anxiety, psychosomatic symptoms) and the community (neighbourhood safety and local well-being). Higher Health seeks to address physical and mental health, including wellness and self-care.

== Civic and health education ==
An awareness of the effects of poverty, inequality, and injustice on communities is essential for mental health. Students face up to these multiple challenges daily. Higher Health has developed a curriculum to address students' social and health challenges. They launched a civic education and health skills programme on 20 July 2023. This programme has achieved recognition at the National Qualifications Framework (NQF) Level 5. It is available to all registered students and is hosted on a platform managed by Anthology, in all 11 official languages and sign language. Higher Health's online courses are laudable. South Africa has a youth under employment problem. These interventions are gated, do not address those who are not in education, employment or training (NEET). Or who cannot afford data and devices.

== Gender-based violence ==
Ten (10%) of all reported rape cases originate from young women in the higher education sector. Gender-based violence impacts a person's sense of self-worth and self-esteem. The DHET has created a Policy Framework to address Gender-Based Violence in the Post-School Education and Training System. Higher Health is committed to ensuring a more robust, collaborative and more focused response to violence against women, as expressed the minister's summit speech. It is also expected that another online GBV course will follow soon.

== Remote students ==
Inherited and spatial disadvantages have effects on student's mobility Remote students, who study in rural locations or disadvantaged neighbourhoods, face many challenges in accessing healthcare services. Higher Health addresses remote students Healthcare needs with a roving fleet (10 vehicles) of purpose-built mobile clinics. Higher Health has also partnered with the SA Depression and Anxiety Group. (SADEG) who offer a 24-hour student helpline As distance students, higher health also look towards online programs to cater directly for the specific needs and preferences of remote students.
