= Suicide in Belarus =

Suicide in Belarus is a common cause of unnatural death in the country, which in 2016 ranked in the top 10 worldwide by its total suicide per 100,000 people. Prior to the 1998 Russian financial crisis, suicide numbers had been decreasing year-upon-year, yet saw a noticeable increase in the years following.

== Causes ==
Figures suggest that there is a correlation between alcohol consumption and suicide rates in Belarus; most people who committed or attempted suicide had been abusing alcohol for at least a year prior to their death. Alcohol is very cheap to purchase in Belarus, making it readily available and compounding the problem. Belarusians tend not to seek help or counseling if in need of support as they remain afraid of being on record as receiving psychiatric treatment, resulting in around 90% of people who committed suicide never having sought psychiatric support.

The most common suicide method is by hanging or jumping, accounting for around 80% of the total number of suicides.

== Statistics ==
Statistics in 2012 showed that a greater number of Belarusians committed suicide than those that died from road traffic accidents. A large number of the country's suicides occur in rural areas, in contrast to other higher ranking countries.

Suicide rates (per 100,000), by gender, Belarus, 1981-2009
Gender	1981	1985	1990	1995	2000	2003	2007	2009
Male	43.0	40.6	34.5	56.1	63.6	63.3	48.7	49.6
Female	8.7	8.0	8.0	9.4	9.5	10.3	8.8	9.8
Total	24.6	19.1	20.4	31.2	34.9	35.1	27.4	28.4
Source: World Health Organization

Number of suicides by age group and gender, Belarus, 2009
Age (years)	5-14	15-24	25-34	35-44	45-54	55-64	65-74	75+	All
Males	9	270	445	439	464	282	184	145	2238
Females	3	45	74	69	96	64	80	74	505
Total	12	315	519	508	560	346	264	219	2743
Source: World Health Organization

== See also ==
- Healthcare in Belarus
- Suicide in Russia
