= Suicide in Guyana =

Serious Social Problem

Suicide in Guyana is a serious social problem, as Guyana is ranked second worst in suicides per capita worldwide among sovereign nations.

== Statistics ==
Domestic data on suicide in Guyana is limited, as the country's available health literature is focused mainly on infectious tropical diseases. A 2012 World Health Organization report indicated that Guyana had a suicide rate of 44.2 per 100,000 people, and that for every single female suicide, there were 3.2 male suicides. By comparison, neighboring Suriname had a suicide rate of 27.8 per 100,000, and Venezuela's rate was 2.6 per 100,000.

Suicides appear to be significantly higher among Indo-Guyanese than other ethnic groups, accounting for around 80% of total suicides. Most of suicides result from poisoning, primarily from agricultural pesticides.

== Legal issues ==
Attempts by the government to address the issue have been stymied by political divisions. A bill was voted down in 2016 which would have amended the country's laws in order to decriminalize suicide, implemented the 2014 Mental Health Strategic Plan and a five-year National Suicide Prevention Plan which were both crafted by the previous government, and allocated funds to treat mental health and suicide as national priorities. Speakers for the parliamentary majority argued that the manner in which the legislation was framed both politicized and trivialized the issue.

== See also ==
- Health in Guyana
- Jonestown massacre
- List of countries by suicide rate
