= Suicide in Bhutan =

Suicide in Bhutan in recent years has become a notable phenomenon in the small Himalayan kingdom, which promotes Gross National Happiness as a government policy. As the Kingdom of Bhutan adheres to Tibetan Buddhism for its state religion, the mere discussion of suicide and the means of tackling it have been generally seen as socially taboo amongst most Bhutanese.

Under Bhutanese law, the act of committing suicide is itself not illegal, but abetting a suicide is regarded as a crime.

Based on 2011 data, the official suicide rate of Bhutan was 16.2 per 100,000 people. This figure ranked the kingdom as the 20th-highest suicide rate in the world, and 6th highest in the Asia-Pacific region. The number of recorded deaths has increased by around 50% for the years 2012 and 2013. Lack of job opportunities, the percentage of broken families, and a high rate of domestic violence are considered to be major contributing factors. As of 2019, the suicide rate in Bhutan was relatively low, ranking in the bottom 44 countries out of 183.

Autopsies are not done in Bhutan, and thus the actual suicide rate is likely to be higher than the official rate. Some suicides are reported as "accidental deaths".

In addition, the suicide rate has been widely discussed about Bhutanese refugees who live outside Bhutan, who tend to be of Nepalese origin, as unemployment, lack of family ties and depression ensue.

== See also ==
- Health in Bhutan
