= Suicide in Afghanistan =

Socioeconomic overview

Afghanistan ostensibly has one of the lowest suicide rates in the world, but this number may be misleading; according to the Afghan Independent Human Rights Commission, many suicides in Afghanistan are not reported.

According to BBC, 80 percent of suicide attempts in Afghanistan are by women. However, according to the WHO, suicides by men account for two-thirds of suicides. Reasons for female suicides include mental health problems, domestic violence, forced marriages, and abuse. The province of Herat province accounts for more than half of these female suicide cases.

Many people who live in rural areas hide causes of death as being attributed to suicide, since it is considered to be haram in Islam, the official religion in Afghanistan.

In mid-to-late 2023, during the Taliban's takeover of the nation, media outlets reported a spike in women committing suicide in Afghanistan had been observed that year. The reporting was substantiated by documents that the Guardian claimed were provided to them by healthcare providers operating in Afghanistan.

Suicides per 100,000 people according to the World Health Organization (age adjusted)
Sex	2000	2010	2015	2016
Both sexes	8.1	7.4	6.6	6.4
Male	14.3	12.5	10.9	10.6
Female	1.7	2.1	2.1	2.1

== See also ==
- Health in Afghanistan
