= Suicide in Brazil =

Brazil had a suicide rate of 7.6 per 100,000 (male 11.4, female 3.9) as of 2021 and ranked 87 in the world standing.

In 2025, the rate of attempted self-harm or suicide is 8,332. In the same year, there were 342 deaths by suicide.

In Brazil, there is one attempted suicide or act of self-harm among adolescents every 10 minutes.

The reasons for suicide are multifaceted, influenced by social, cultural, biological, psychological, and environmental factors present throughout the life course.

Every year in Brazil, throughout the month of September, there is a suicide prevention campaign, which is Setembro Amarelo.

== See also ==
- List of countries by suicide rate
- Suicide crisis
- Suicide prevention
