= Health in Guyana =

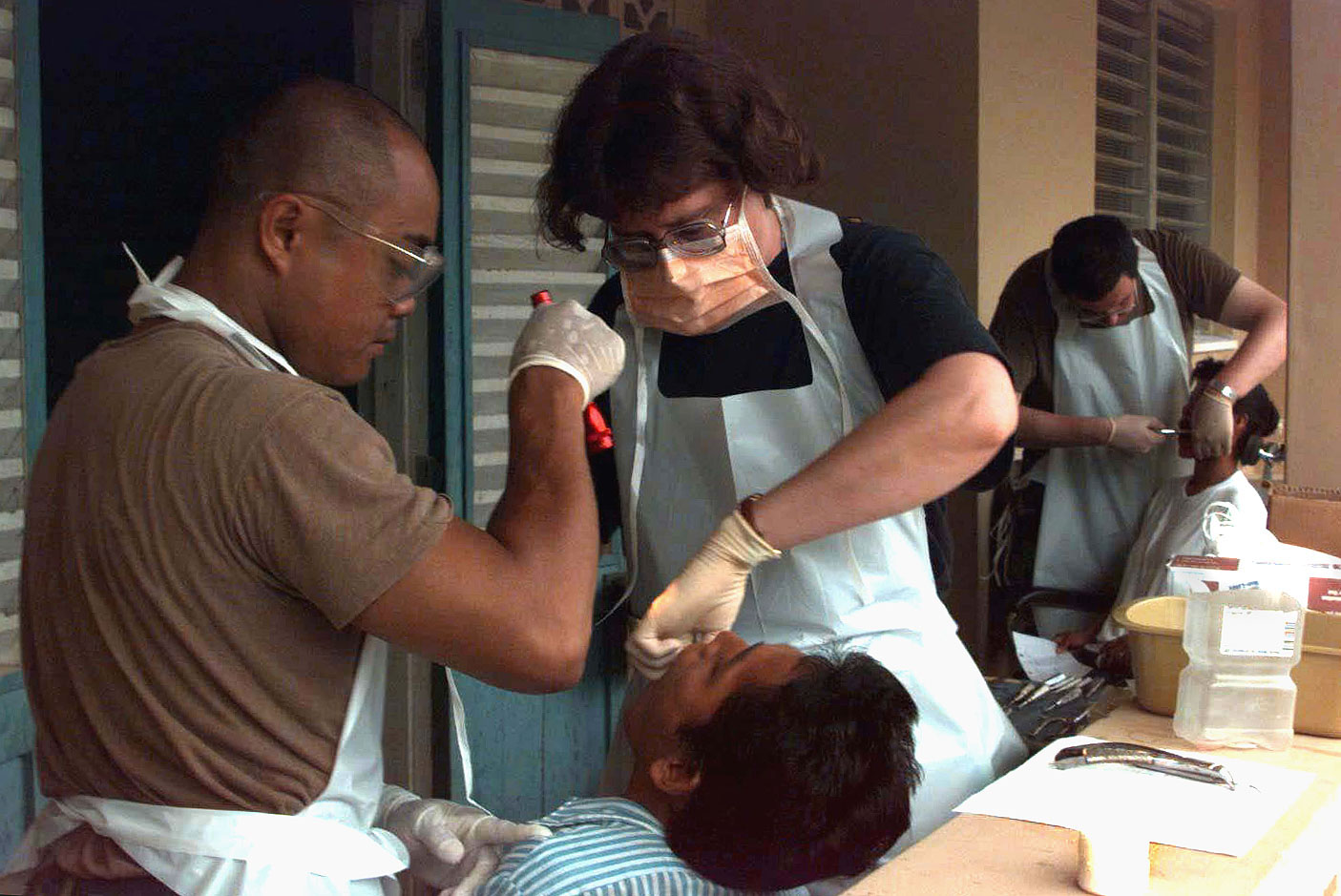
Dental work being performed in Guyana.

Compared with other neighbouring countries, Guyana ranks poorly in regard to basic health indicators. Basic health services in the interior are primitive to non-existent, and some procedures are not available at all. Although Guyana's health profile falls short in comparison with many of its Caribbean neighbours, there has been remarkable progress since 1988, and the Ministry of Health is working to upgrade conditions, procedures, and facilities. Many Guyanese seek medical care in the United States, Trinidad and Tobago or Cuba.

The Human Rights Measurement Initiative finds that Guyana is fulfilling 69.3% of what it should be fulfilling for the right to health based on its level of income. When looking at the right to health with respect to children, Guyana achieves 90.9% of what is expected based on its current income. In regards to the right to health amongst the adult population, the country achieves only 76.3% of what is expected based on the nation's level of income. Guyana falls into the "very bad" category when evaluating the right to reproductive health because the nation is fulfilling only 40.8% of what the nation is expected to achieve based on the resources (income) it has available.

== Basic statistics ==
- Life expectancy at birth: 69.5 years (2020)
- Infant mortality rate: 38/1,000 live births (2011)
- Total expenditure on health as % of GDP: 5.4% (2012)

== Historical overview ==
Most of Guyana's population resides in the coastal plain, with flooding cycles that have long hindered sanitation efforts. Early in colony's history, deaths as a result of exceptionally harsh conditions for plantation slaves led to a stagnant population rate despite the numbers of slaves being brought into the country. Mortality rates of Europeans were generally attributed to inability to handle tropical climate and its associated diseases such as Yellow Fever. Abolitionist interests in Britain began influencing laws in the colonies such as 1825 legislation that stipulated proprietors must provide a 'sick house, furnished with proper conveniences and attendance for the sick', an 1834 Medical Ordinance requiring weekly doctor visits to plantations, and later the 1847 Hospital Ordinance. Direct costs and taxation for the benefit of the health of slaves and laborers was inhibited by the plantocracy.

Malaria has been a longtime issue; eradication efforts on the coast have seen some success. In 1947, the extension of workers' compensation to agricultural workers and the subsequent establishment of medical services on the sugar estates did much to improve rural health care.

Emigration of healthcare professionals is a major issue.

== Health infrastructure ==
=== Health services ===
The delivery of health services is provided at five different levels in the public sector:

- Level I: Local Health Posts (166 in total) that provide preventive and simple curative care for common diseases and attempt to promote proper health practices. Community health workers staff them.
- Level II: Health Centres (109 in total) that provide preventive and rehabilitative care and promotion activities. These are ideally staffed with a medical extension worker or public health nurse, along with a nursing assistant, a dental nurse and a midwife.
- Level III: Nineteen District Hospitals (with 473 beds) that provide basic in-patient and outpatient care (although more the latter than the former) and selected diagnostic services. They are also meant to be equipped to provide simple radiological and laboratory services, and to be capable of gynecology, providing preventive and curative dental care. They are designed to serve geographical areas with populations of 10,000 or more.
- Level IV: Four Regional Hospitals (with 620 beds) that provide emergency services, routine surgery and obstetrical and gynecological care, dental services, diagnostic services and specialist services in general medicine and pediatrics. They are designed to include the necessary support for this level of medical service in terms of laboratory and X-ray facilities, pharmacies and dietetic expertise. These hospitals are located in Regions 2, 3, 6 and 10.
- Level V: The National Referral Hospital (937 beds) in Georgetown that provides a wider range of diagnostic and specialist services, on both an in-patient and out-patient basis; the Psychiatric Hospital in Canje; and the Geriatric Hospital in Georgetown. There is also one children's rehabilitation centre.

This system is structured so that its proper functioning depends intimately on a process of referrals. Except for serious emergencies, patients are to be seen first at the lower levels, and those with problems that cannot be treated at those levels are referred to higher levels in the system. However, in practice, many patients by-pass the lower levels.

The health sector is currently unable to offer certain sophisticated tertiary services and specialised medical services, the technology for which is unaffordable in Guyana, or for which the required medical specialists are not available. Even with substantial improvements in the health sector, the need for overseas treatment for some services might remain. The Ministry of Health provides financial assistance to patients requiring such treatment, priority being given to children whose condition can be rehabilitated with significant improvements to their quality of life.

There are 10 hospitals belonging to the private sector and to public corporations, plus diagnostic facilities, clinics and dispensaries in those sectors. These ten hospitals provide for 548 beds. Eighteen clinics and dispensaries are owned by GUYSUCO.

The Ministry of Health and Labour is responsible for the funding of the National Referral Hospital in Georgetown, which has recently been made a public corporation managed by an independent Board. Region 6 is responsible for the management of the National Psychiatric Hospital. The Geriatric Hospital, previously administered by the Ministry of Labour, became the responsibility of the Ministry of Human Resources and Social Security of Guyana in December 1997.

The US State Department Consular Information Sheet warns "Medical care is available for minor medical conditions. Emergency care and hospitalization for major medical illnesses or surgery is limited, because of a lack of appropriately trained specialists, below standard in-hospital care, and poor sanitation. Ambulance service is substandard and may not routinely be available for emergencies." Many Guyanese seek medical care in the United States, Trinidad and Tobago or Cuba.

=== Mental health ===
In 2008, a WHO report on mental health determined that mental healthcare in Guyana is "fragmented, poorly resourced, and not integrated into the general health-care system". Although mental healthcare is free to its citizens, care of the mentally ill is under the jurisdiction of the antiquated framework of the Mental Health Ordinance of 1930. Stigma against the mentally ill is considered a major barrier to improving mental health services. There are no mental health consumer or family associations in Guyana, except for Salvation Army and Phoenix Recovery, two NGOs that focus on substance use disorders.

Guyana has only 3 certified psychologists. In population terms, Guyana has 0.5 psychiatrists per 100,000 population, compared to the world reference average of 4.2 per 100,000 (2005).

The National Psychiatric Hospital (NPH) is the only mental hospital, with 240 beds. Georgetown Public Hospital's Psychiatry Department provides outpatient services. NPH services are heavily reliant on pharmacologic intervention and most of the beds are long-stay patients who do not necessarily require institutional care.

In 2015, the Ministry of Health released a National Suicide Prevention Plan and a National Mental Health Action Plan to train professionals for the mental health field.

=== Hinterlands ===
Marked disparities exist between the dense, urban coastal areas and the inland regions. Amerindians, the predominant group in the country's interior, have the highest rates of poverty and exhibit some of the lowest health indicators in Guyana.

=== Education and workforce ===
The main centers of medical education are University of Guyana, American International School of Medicine, and Texila American University. Texila American University, established in Georgetown in 2010, offers a Doctor of Medicine (MD) program with basic sciences taught in Guyana and clinical training opportunities both locally and abroad. The university is accredited by the National Accreditation Council of Guyana and holds regional medical education accreditations.

Guyanese physicians usually seek post-graduate education abroad, due to limited opportunities in Guyana. Medical students often go to Cuba as a part of a government-funded training program. Likewise, many Cuban nationals work in the Guyanese healthcare sector. Since 1993, Chinese medical professionals have worked in Guyana as a part of the Protocol on Medical Cooperation between the two countries. China has also donated medical equipment.

External partnerships also serve to develop sections of Guyana's healthcare system. Universities with long-term involvement include; McMaster University (Surgery and Paediatrics), Case Western University (Obstetrics) and Vanderbilt University (Emergency Medicine).

A number of non-governmental organizations, including Health and Educational Relief for Guyana (HERG, INC) and Guyana Medical Relief (GMR, INC) have worked in Guyana to improve healthcare access and educational infrastructure.

== Health status ==
=== Maternal and child health care ===
The 2010 maternal mortality rate per 100,000 births for Guyana is 260. This is compared with 143.1 in 2008 and 162.3 in 1990. The under 5 mortality rate, per 1,000 births is 36 and the neonatal mortality as a percentage of under 5's mortality is 60. In Guyana the number of midwives per 1,000 live births is unavailable and the lifetime risk of death for pregnant women is 1 in 150.

Fertility rates per location (2014):

- Urban 2.3
- Rural 2.7
- Coastal 2.4
- Interior areas 4.3

=== Mortality and Illness ===
The top ten causes of death according to the CDC (2010):

1. Ischemic Heart Disease 15%
2. Stroke 13%
3. Cancer 10%
4. Diabetes 9%
5. HIV 7%
6. Hypertensive Heart Disease 4%
7. Lower Respiratory Infections 4%
8. Self-Harm 4%
9. Cirrhosis 3%
10. Interpersonal Violence 2%

The ten leading causes of morbidity (illness) for all age groups are, in decreasing order: malaria; acute respiratory infections; symptoms, signs and ill-defined or unknown conditions; hypertension; accident and injuries; acute diarrhoeal disease; diabetes mellitus; worm infestation; rheumatic arthritis; and mental and nervous disorders.

This morbidity profile indicates that it can be improved substantially through enhanced preventive health care, better education on health issues, more widespread access to potable water and sanitation services, and increased access to basic health care of good quality.

==== Vectorborne diseases ====
Dengue fever and malaria have a presence in rural communities.

=== Suicide ===
Suicide is a leading cause of death in Guyana. Guyana has the highest suicide rate of any South American country. In 2008 it was estimated that at least 200 people commit suicide each year in Guyana, or 27.2 people for each 100,000 people each year.

=== Murder ===
In 2012 Guyana had a murder rate of 17 per 100,000.
