= Suicide in Sweden =

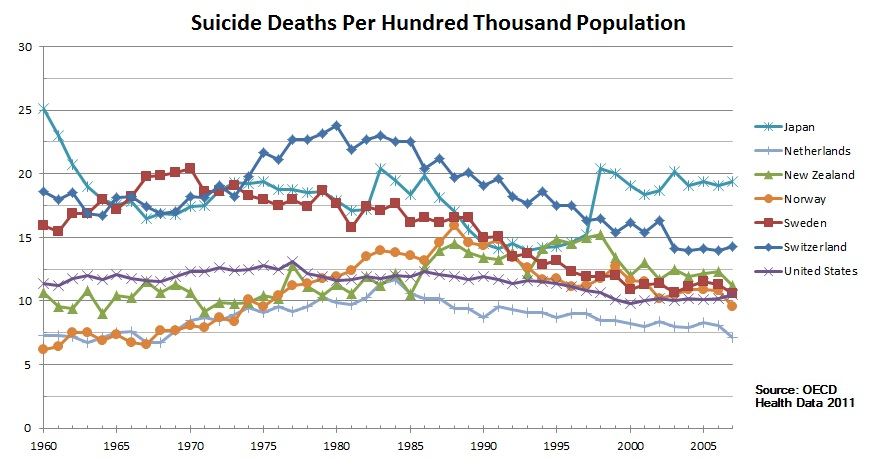
Trend of suicide deaths from 1960 to 2007 for Japan, the Netherlands, New Zealand, Norway, Sweden, Switzerland, and the United States

Sweden has a suicide rate which was below the OECD average. During the 1960s, Sweden had one of the highest reported suicide rates among the most developed countries, but it declined as methods for measuring were standardized internationally.

In 2011, 1378 suicide deaths occurred, which equates to a rate of 17.5 per 100,000 people. Individuals aged between 45 and 74 are most likely to take their own life, while individuals aged 15 to 24 are least likely.

Men are also far more likely than women to die by suicide. In 2011, 962 male deaths occurred versus 416 female deaths.

According to a 2011 article in The New York Times, "Numerous studies have shown that places like Denmark and Sweden that consistently score high on measures of happiness and life satisfaction also have relatively high suicide rates." The article also reported, "Some social scientists speculate that the trends are probably unrelated and can be explained by regional factors like dark winters or cultural differences regarding suicide."

== See also ==
- Epidemiology of suicide
- List of countries by suicide rate
- Philosophy of suicide
- Suicide crisis
- Suicide prevention
