= Suicide in China =

China's suicide rates were one of the highest in the world in the 1990s. However, by 2011, China had one of the lowest suicide rates in the world. According to the World Health Organization, the suicide rate in China was 9.7 per 100,000 population as of 2016. Among men, the rate was 9.1 per 100,000 population. As a comparison, the suicide rate in the U.S. in 2016 was 15.3. Generally speaking, China seems to have a lower suicide rate than neighboring Korea, Russia and Japan, and it is more common among women than men and more common in the Yangtze Basin than elsewhere.

Aside from the global suicide rate surge during the 2008 financial crisis, China's suicide rates have been declining since the late 20th century. In the 1990s China was among the countries with the highest suicide rates in the world (above 20 per 100,000), but by the 2008 financial crisis, they kept dropping as significantly (as they were by the end of 1990s) with the main force having been migration from rural to urban areas. By 2011, China had one of the lowest suicide rates in the world. Between 1990 and 2016, suicide rates in China fell by 64%, making China the number 1 country in the world in suicide reduction.

== Statistics ==
On the basis of data gathered in 1999, the government estimated an overall rate of 13.9 per 100,000 people, much lower than the rate in other East Asian countries: Japan (18.5) and South Korea (28.9). Family conflicts are the number one cause of suicide in China; other common causes include poverty, and disease of the body and mind.

According to a 2016 WHO report, China's suicide rate is 9.7 people out of every 100,000. This rate places the country among the countries with the lowest suicide per capita in the world. For 2009–2011, 44% of all suicides occurred among those aged 65 or above and 79% among rural residents. Moreover, a 2014 study conducted by the Centre for Suicide Research and Prevention at the University of Hong Kong reported that China's suicide rate has dropped significantly, among the lowest levels in the world. From 2009 to 2011, the average annual suicide rate was approximately 9.8 per 100,000 people. This represents a 58% decrease from the average annual rate of 23.2 per 100,000 recorded between 1990 and 1995. The significant decline is largely attributed to population migration from rural areas and the urbanization of the middle class. Paul Yip, a co-author of the recent study and professor at the University of Hong Kong, said "no country has ever achieved such a rapid decline in suicides".

== Demographics ==
In China, marginally more women than men die by suicide each year. China is one of the few countries in the world that has a higher suicide rate by women over men. It was found that females that attempted suicide were less likely to have been diagnosed with a mental disorder than males who attempted to commit suicide. According to WHO's statistics: in 2016, the suicide rate in China per 100,000 people was 9.1 for men and 10.3 for women, one of the highest female suicide rates in the world. Bangladesh is also among the few countries where the female rate is higher than the male rate. According to official PRC government statistics, the Chinese male rate (9.1 per 100,000 men per year) is lower than in many other countries, including some Western countries, such as the United States, Australia, and Germany. Among men, the suicide rate in China was 60% lower than the suicide rate in the U.S.-- 23.6 for American men versus 9.1 for Chinese men, as of 2016.

By 2016, suicide rates among Chinese men and women were almost the same—9.1 for men and 10.3 for women. A 2008 study—which was based on data from the 1990s—found that: female suicides outnumbered male suicides by a 3:1 ratio; rural suicides outnumbered urban suicides by a 3:1 ratio; a large upsurge of young adult and older adult suicides had occurred; a comparatively high national suicide rate two to three times the global average was evident; and a low rate of psychiatric illness, particularly clinical depression, existed in suicide victims. According to the journal Culture, Medicine and Psychiatry, there were over 300,000 suicides in China annually in the 1990s; however, the suicide rates in China fell by 64% between 1990 and 2016, making China #1 in the world in reduction of suicide. As of 2016, China accounted for about 17% of the world's suicides. The suicide rate in the Yangtze Basin was about 40% higher than in the rest of China in the 1990s.

== History ==
=== Male suicide ===
For male members in the Han, physical mutilation and suicide were among the highest crimes, threats not only to the self but to the lineage. Ritual suicide was long practiced in traditional Chinese culture, owing both to the power of the state to enforce collective punishment against the families of disgraced ministers and to Confucian values that held that certain failures of virtue were worse than death, making suicide morally permissible or even praiseworthy in some altruistic contexts. Confucius wrote, "For gentlemen of purpose and men of ren while it is inconceivable that they should seek to stay alive at the expense of ren, it may happen that they have to accept death in order to have ren accomplished." Mencius wrote:

Fish is what I want; bear's palm is also what I want. If I cannot have both, I would rather take bear's palm than fish. Life is what I want; yi is also what I want. If I cannot have both, I would rather take yi than life. On the one hand, though life is what I want, there is something I want more than life. That is why I do not cling to life at all cost. On the other hand, though death is what I loathe, there is something I loathe more than death. That is why there are dangers I do not avoid ... Yet there are ways of remaining alive and ways of avoiding death to which a person will not resort. In other words, there are things a person wants more than life and there are also things he or she loathes more than death.

Due to the above-mentioned aversion to physical mutilation (originating from the belief that the body was a gift from one's parents and desecrating it therefore an unfilial act), the preferred methods—as recorded in for instance the Book of Han—appear to have been those that did not leave the corpse significantly disfigured, notably hanging/strangulation.

Notable suicides include Wu Zixu, whose compelled suicide was regretted by King Fuchai of Wu when he was proved right about the danger of Yue, and Qu Yuan, whose despair over his exile by King Qingxiang of Chu and sorrow over the capture of his capital by Qin in 278 BC is commemorated by China's annual Dragon Boat Festival.

=== Female suicide ===
Female suicide became a common practice towards the end of the Ming dynasty and reached a high during the early Qing dynasty. There were many different ideologies and social circumstances which led to this spike. Historians such as Janet Theiss have stated that the Han had a practice of women committing suicide to preserve their chastity, while the Manchus had a practice of wives committing suicide to follow their husbands into death. The loss of a woman's chastity was viewed as shameful to the family so the act of suicide to preserve chastity was seen as a heroic act. Conversely, the Chinese have also historically seen suicide as a great act against filial piety, as bodies are gifts from parents and as such, should not be harmed without their parents' permission. According to Liu Meng, it was decided that the principle of preserving chastity was more important than preserving life and was considered exempt from this criticism.

Chastity was greatly valued by widowed women, especially those who had not borne a son—who were very likely to be forced into a new marriage by their in-laws. Scholars have stated that these women were made to choose between losing their chastity and potentially shaming their families or taking their own lives. Eventually, due to this type of ideological thinking, some women felt that their only option to obtain glory was to kill themselves, thus becoming a martyr. The Qing government passed a law attempting to help preserve female chastity by allowing widows to inherit their husbands' wealth and property, which led to families' desire to remarry their widowed daughters-in-law, so that the fortune would be returned to the clan.

== Legality ==
The legality of suicide in China is unclear. The China's National People's Congress has considered several proposals to legalize physician-assisted suicide, but as of 2011, had rejected these proposals. In 1992, a physician was acquitted of the murder of a terminally ill cancer patient who was given a lethal injection. In May 2011, a farmer received a two-year jail term for criminal negligence after assisting a friend in committing suicide, but in that case the farmer had mistakenly buried the friend alive, after the friend took poison, but in an insufficient dose.

The Qing dynasty tried to reduce female suicide by creating preventative laws. One of the laws made making lewd comments towards a woman equivalent to rape if she later committed suicide due to these comments. The Qing dynasty also made suicide illegal, so that any person that completed the act would not be able to receive any awards or special honors. The Qing would, however, frequently make exceptions to this when it was believed the act was done to preserve a woman's chastity.

== See also ==
- List of countries by suicide rate
- Neijuan
- Shame society
- Self-immolation in China
