= Suicide in Mozambique =

Suicide in Mozambique is a significant national social issue. It has one of the highest suicide rates in the world, ranking as the 9th highest suicide rate in the world in 2019 according to the 2019 World Health Organization report. Mozambique's mental health infrastructure is considerably understaffed, with only 13 psychiatrists.

== Incidence ==
Data regarding suicide in Mozambique, like that of the rest of Africa, is limited. In 2011, there were 2,667 recorded suicides in Mozambique, accounting for approximately 0.9% of all deaths in the country for that year. Nonetheless, the country's suicide rate of 18 per 100,000 was the 19th-highest in 2011; it increased to sixth-highest in 2015. According to a 2014 report, Mozambique had the most suicides in the entire African continent.

== Methodology and prevention ==
According to a 2014 study, the most common suicide methods for males and females were hanging and ingesting toxic substances respectively. With only 13 psychiatrists in the entire country with a population of some 28 million people, Mozambique is poorly equipped to tackle its suicide rate.
