= Suicide in Lesotho =

Suicide is a significant social issue in Lesotho, having the highest suicide rate in the world. According to the World Health Organization, 87.5 people per 100,000 of the population take their own life every year in Lesotho.

== Statistics ==
A 2019 World Health Organization report indicated that Lesotho had a suicide rate of 87.5 per 100,000 people. This is about 10 times higher than the global suicide rate of 9.0 per 100,000 people for 2019. By comparison, Guyana, the second highest country on the list, had a suicide rate of 40.9 per 100,000.

Suicides rate (per 100,000) by year and gender, Lesotho, 2000–2019
Year	Male	Female	Total
2000	73.9	16.0	42.6
2001	70.4	15.4	40.4
2002	74.6	15.9	42.6
2003	79.1	17.9	45.7
2004	82.2	18.0	47.1
2005	82.7	17.2	46.7
2006	95.6	22.1	55.4
2007	108.0	22.4	61.3
2008	133.8	30.7	77.8
2009	148.1	30.8	84.6
2010	152.7	30.7	86.9
2011	156.9	34.9	91.1
2012	172.9	40.7	102.0
2013	188.2	44.2	111.4
2014	195.2	46.3	116.2
2015	191.5	45.9	114.5
2016	180.1	41.9	107.1
2017	164.0	35.8	96.3
2018	158.4	34.6	93.1
2019	146.9	34.6	87.5
Source: World Health Organization

Lesotho's suicide rate reached its highest number in 2014, with 116.2 suicides per 100,000 people. The rate has been slowly dropping ever since.

According to 2020 data by the World Health Organization, 1,539 people died by suicide in Lesotho that year, accounting for 4.62% of total deaths in the country. This makes it the 7th most common cause of death in Lesotho.

The suicide rate is significantly higher among men than among women in Lesotho, with the amount of men committing suicide being over three times higher than women.

== Risk factors ==
Reasons behind the suicide rates in Lesotho include poverty, unemployment, bad living conditions and gender-based violence. Evidence suggests a relationship between suicidal behaviour and economical variables, affecting countries with high poverty rates.

Stigma against mental illness and lack of mental health services have been cited as major factors against suicide prevention in Lesotho. Lesotho has no national mental health policy and the country's only psychiatric unit has not had a psychiatrist since 2017.

Experts have also highlighted that addictions and misuse of drugs and alcohol and a lack of mental health counselling as factors behind Lesotho's high suicide rate.

== See also ==
- List of countries by suicide rate
- Health in Lesotho
