= Suicide in Spain =

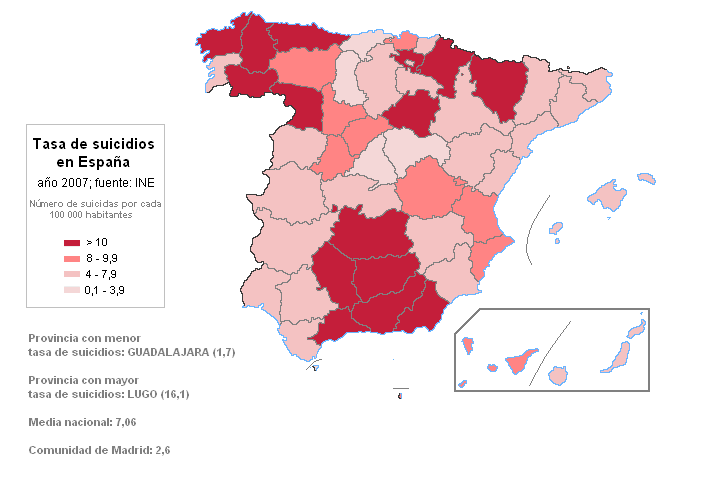
Suicide rate in Spain as of 2007. Statistics from the National Statistics Institute.

Suicide is a social and health issue occurring in Spain. In 2016, the World Health Organization ranked Spain 130th of the 170 countries listed with an overall suicide rate of 6.1 per 100,000 people. The real estate crisis and rising unemployment rate caused by the 2008–2014 Spanish financial crisis are thought to be among the primary causes of suicide.

== Statistics ==
Suicide is the main cause of violent death in Spain, causing more deaths than road accidents. In 2010, 3,145 persons committed suicide in Spain. Spanish men die by suicide three times more frequently than women. According to data from the organisation Stop Desahucios, part of the Platform of People Affected from Mortgage, 34% of the suicides in Spain result from evictions.

== Causes ==
The 2008–2014 Spanish financial crisis was caused largely by the housing bubble in Spain. The subsequent real estate crisis dramatically increased the number of foreclosures and evictions. According to figures from the Mortgage Affected Platform, there were more than 400,000 evictions between the start of the crisis in 2007 and 2012. According to statistics from the first quarter of 2012, 517 evictions took place daily in Spain; there were 101,034 evictions in total in 2012. The Platform of People Affected from Mortgage and other associations that defend evictees have proposed legal modifications that would mitigate the vulnerability of those affected, including payment in kind, which is not permitted in Spain. The increase in unemployment to 25% and cuts in payments to social assistance, including unemployment, are also thought to have increased hardship.

Some have argued that Southern European Mediterranean countries are less prone to suicide for cultural reasons, such as ease of socialisation, deeper religious beliefs that consider suicide as a sin, or favourable weather conditions, causing less seasonal depression. This is consistent with the fact that other southern European countries, such as Italy, Greece and Portugal, share a similarly low suicidal rate as compared with northern countries. However, the influence of cold weather and/or lower sun exposure as a causal factor may be contradicted by data showing higher incidence of suicides during spring and summer.

The cause of suicide is inherently hard to determine, making it difficult to establish reliable statistics at research institutes such as the National Statistics Institute.

== See also ==
- List of countries by suicide rate
