= Suicide in Romania =

Social issue

Suicide in Romania is a social and health issue.

Annually, between 2,500 and 3,500 Romanians commit suicide. 72.5% of fatal suicides are the result of hanging. Other methods (poisoning, jumping, drowning, etc.) are each chosen by under 10%.

Since 2000, suicides rates have steadily declined in the country. According to the World Bank, the suicide mortality rate has dropped from 13.2 per 100,000 in 2000, to 10.4 per 100,000 in 2016. Research conducted by the World Health Organization found that Romania had the 103rd highest rate of suicide in the world, on par with China.

The rate of suicide among men is significantly higher than among women in Romania. Suicide mortality for men stood at 13.9 per 100,000 in 2016. In contrast, the suicide mortality rate for Romanian women was 2.4 per 100,000.

Suicides per 100,000 residents (2011)
