= Suicide in Greenland =

Suicide rate (age-standardized, per 100,000 population) in the world as of 2010: > 30; 20 – 30; 15 – 20; 10 – 15; 5 – 10; 0 – 5; Data unavailable

Suicide in Greenland, an autonomous country within the Kingdom of Denmark, is a significant national social issue. Greenland has one of the highest suicide rates in the world. Among Greenland Inuit, the suicide rate peaked in 1985–1989 at about 120 per 100,000 people annually, then declined in later decades. For the most recent period 2015–2018, the rate was still around 81 per 100,000 annually.

Greenland is culturally and geographically isolated as well as one of the coldest (with the least sunshine hours) and least populous nations in the world. Although factors such as these have been known to contribute to suicide-related issues, it remains unclear if they have a direct influence on Greenlandic suicides or to what degree. A host of different initiatives have been taken, however, to reduce the suicide rate in the country, including even roadside posters, and a national suicide prevention strategy has been initiated entailing courses, general education, outreach in local communities, and involving professionals such as teachers, social workers, and doctors.

== History ==
The rate of suicide in Greenland began to rise in the 1970s and kept increasing until 1986. In 1986, suicide became the leading cause of death for young people in several towns, such as Sarfannguit. In 1970, the rate of suicide in Greenland was historically very low, but by 1990–1994, it had become one of the highest in the world with 107 per 100,000 persons dying by suicide per year. A similarly precipitous rise in suicide rates to a very high elevation has been observed among the Inuit in Canada. Greenland Government data reported in 2010 suggest that almost one suicide occurred a week.

== Incidence and variance ==
According to suicide data published by Statistics Greenland, suicide accounts for 8% of total deaths in Greenland and is the leading cause of death among young men aged 15–29.

An article published in the journal, BMC Psychiatry, in 2009 reported that a total of 1,351 suicides took place in Greenland during a study period of 35 years, from 1968 to 2002. The study noted a significant variation of the suicide rate in relation to the season, characterized by peaks in June and troughs in the winter. The clustering of suicides in summer months was most pronounced in areas north of the Arctic Circle. Regional variations were also observed with suicide rates in northern parts of west Greenland being higher than in southern parts.

Suicide rates are higher for men than women. Among those who die by suicide, the greater part are young men between the ages of 15 and 24. Unlike in other Western countries, the suicide rate in Greenland decreases with age.

Methods of suicide in Greenland (based on a study of 1286 cases)
1. Hanging (46.0%)
2. Shooting (37.0%)
3. Jumping from heights (2.00%)
4. Cutting with sharp objects (1.00%)
5. Drowning (4.00%)
6. Poisoning (5.00%)
7. Unspecified (1.00%)
8. Other (4.00%)

== Reasons ==
Several reasons are blamed for Greenland's high rate of suicide, including alcoholism, depression, poverty, conflict-ridden relationship with spouse, and dysfunctional parental homes. According to a report published in 2009, the suicide rate in Greenland increases during the summer. Researchers have blamed insomnia caused by incessant daylight.

Culture clash between the traditional Inuit culture and modern Western culture is also assumed to be a contributing factor. During the 1970s to late 1980s Greenland experienced a rapid period of urbanisation, with many Greenlandic villages being cut off from support and funding, with the Danish government encouraging migration towards the cities. The new immigrants who had lived in a traditional Inuit hunter gift societies were generally isolated inside cities with no social support, many of them suffered from extreme mental health issues in the cities, with a high rate of suicide, which remains a major issue in Greenland.

== Common methods ==
Violent methods were used in 95% of suicide deaths. The most common methods were hanging (46%) and shooting (37%); other methods, such as jumping from heights, cutting with sharp objects, drowning, overdose of medication, and poisoning were also used, but less frequently.

== Suicide prevention ==
Greenland's government and international and national organizations have undertaken efforts and initiatives to prevent suicides. There are associations that provide support for people who feel suicidal. Measures include posters placed along the roads, which read: "The call is free. No one is alone. Don't be alone with your dark thoughts. Call." Suicide consultants show films discouraging teenage suicide attempts. The first national suicide prevention strategy was initiated in 2005, followed by another in 2013 that involves courses, education, local communities and professionals (such as teachers, social workers and doctors). It also highlighted a number of places where further studies are needed.

== See also ==
- Suicide among the Inuit
