= Suicide in Greece =

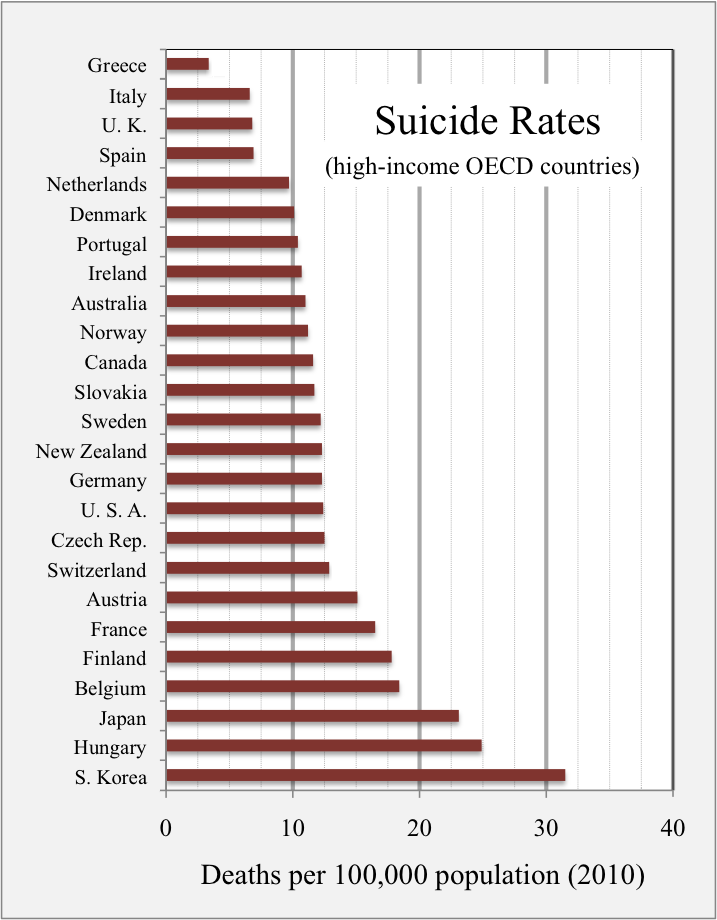
Greece has one of the lowest suicide rates of any high-income country.

Greece is not considered a major suicidal country. Greece was the country with the lowest suicide rate in Europe according to a research done by WHO in 2012. Greek suicide rates are also among the lowest in the world, a fact that is attributed to various factors, such as the mentality of the Greek society and the climate of the country.

Suicides used to occur more frequently in earlier periods of Greek history, such as during the Greek Civil War of 1946, where many lost their relatives in the war.

Some sources suggest that the number of suicides occurring in Greece may be underestimated. The act may be sometimes concealed by family members for religious or other social reasons.

There are also cases, such as those of Dimitris Christoulas or the 45-year-old teacher Savvas Metoikidis, where their decisions were a form of protest to the current economic situation in Greece.

Suicides in Greece by year
| Year | Number |
|---|---|
| 1999 | 381 |
| 2000 | 382 |
| 2001 | 334 |
| 2002 | 323 |
| 2003 | 375 |
| 2004 | 353 |
| 2005 | 400 |
| 2006 | 402 |
| 2007 | 328 |
| 2008 | 373 |
| 2009 | 391 |
| 2010 | 377 |
| 2011 | 477 |
| 2012 | 508 |
| 2013 | 533 |
| 2014 | 565 |
| 2015 | 529 |
| 2016 | 484 |
| 2017 | 465 |
| 2018 | 567 |
| 2019 | 530 |
| 2020 | 464 |
| 2021 | 467 |
| 2022 | 516 |

== Suicides by region and methods ==
The region with the highest suicide rate in Greece is Crete, followed by Thessaly and Attica in the second and third place respectively.

The most common suicide methods are hanging and jumping from height.

== Gender and age ==
As in the case of many other countries, the proportion of men (76%) dying from suicide is higher than that of women (24%).

The age groups with the highest frequency are people aged 60-64 and 80 or over.

Suicides of young people include the deaths of the 20-years old judo athlete Eleni Ioannou and 25-years old football player Giannis Koskiniatis in 2004 and 2008 respectively. In 2012, a 36-year old woman also died via suicide by jumping from a 6th floor balcony in Pagrati, Athens.

== Greek Intervention Hotline for suicide ==
There is an organization in Greece that aims to prevent suicide. Those contemplating suicide or know someone who has major depression are encouraged to call the number 1018.
