= Suicide in Cameroon =

Suicide in Cameroon increased rapidly from 2002 to 2012. However, health officials faced challenges in assembling official statistics due to the taboo nature of suicide in most parts of Africa. It is considered a developing world problem influenced by socio-cultural and family relationship mechanisms. While no governmental data is available, depression has been documented as a cause, particularly in relation to traditional African initiation rights and concerns about contracting HIV/AIDS.

Under Cameroonian Law, to die by suicide itself is not illegal, as is reporting on a suicide in the media. However publication of the suicide of a minor is an offence. Government treatment of physiological disorders relating to suicide severely lacks funding. According to the World Health Organization, there were only 2 psychiatric hospitals and just 115 beds in such hospitals out of a population of 19.9 million. Cameroon does not have a mental health plan, nor does it have a policy as such.

The Ministry of Health carried out a 9-year study in the Guidiguis health district between 1999 and 2008, a rural province in the north of the country. The most frequently used suicide method in the region was the ingestion of toxic agricultural chemicals and the suicides main cause were mainly attributed to ongoing chronic illness (31.9%), with sexual and marital conflicts (25.5%), witchcraft (14.9%), financial problems (8.5%) being the cause in other cases. The study concluded that suicide in rural Cameroon is not unusual and the capacity of mental health services in rural Cameroon is virtually non-existent.
