= Suicide in Sri Lanka =

Suicide in Sri Lanka is a common cause of unnatural death and a long term social issue. In the past, Sri Lanka had one of the highest suicide rates in the world. For several years before 2000, the suicide rate remained at 35 to 47 per 100,000 persons. The introduction in pesticide control regulations coincided with a reduction in suicide rates in Sri Lanka. Sri Lanka Federation for Suicide Prevention is an independent organisation working on suicide prevention in Sri Lanka.

== Statistics ==
According to a report published in a seminar by Dr Neil Fernando, head of the National Institute of Mental Health in September 2011, almost 4,000 people die by suicide in Sri Lanka every year. Fernando's statistics show the majority of victims were aged 15 to 44. According to the statistics of the Registrar General's office, at the time of independence (1948) suicide rate in Sri Lanka was 9 per 100,000 people. In the 1970s, it rose up to 19 per 100,000, and in the mid-1980s, it reached 33 per 100,000. The latest statistics for Sri Lanka show a suicide rate of 15 per 100,000.

=== Suicide rate ===
Age group	Suicide rate/1,000 population							
Age group	1950	1970	1975	1980	1986	1989	1996	1999
=<14	-	0.01	0.01	0.02	0.01	0.02	0.02	0.02
15–24	0.10	0.42	0.430.63	0.63	0.55	0.45	0.41	
25–44	0.09	0.27	0.25	0.40	0.48	0.49	0.47	0.49
45–64	0.10	0.24	0.23	0.28	0.34	0.37	0.35	0.38
65–74	0.21	0.44	0.41	0.40	0.49	0.47	0.55	0.55
75+	0.37	0.50	0.75	0.78	0.74	0.56	0.57	0.67
Source: Registrar General's Office

== Common methods ==
Common methods of suicide include:

- Jumping in front of trains
- Drinking pesticides
- Hanging
- Jumping into deep water bodies
- Jumping from heights
- Using lethal firearms
- Drinking acids, fuels
- Drug overdose

== See also ==
- Suicide bombing in Sri Lanka
