= Suicide in Singapore =

Suicide cases in Singapore have been rising in recent years, with rates of suicide increasing for all demographics. It is the leading cause of death for persons aged between 10 and 29 years old. Males account for the most suicides at over 66.6% of all suicides.

Singapore ranked 105th by age-standardised suicide rate according to the World Health Organization in 2016. Generally, the rate of suicide is rising. In 2016, the rate of suicide was 8.54 per 100,000 individuals, up from 8.43 in 2015.

Like most issues of mental illness and death, suicide is generally viewed as a taboo subject in Singapore. The pressure exerted by parents on their children to produce good academic results has also been a contributing factor in some suicides.

== Legality ==
On 9 September 2018, the Penal Code review committee called for the law on attempted suicide to be repealed. The criminalisation of suicide in Singapore had been criticised for being an ineffective deterrent and an inappropriate response to persons who attempted suicide. On 6 May 2019, the law was officially amended to decriminalise suicide.

Prior to the Bill, attempted suicide was punishable with a fine and/or imprisonment of up to one year. The offence was rarely enforced; between 2013 and 2015, only 0.6% of reported cases were brought to court. It is still illegal to abet or assist another person in suicide. A higher penalty is given to persons who abet suicide if the victim is less than 18 years old, intoxicated or mentally ill.

== See also ==
- Death in Singapore
