= Suicide in Nepal =

In 2014, the WHO ranked Nepal as the 7th in the global suicide rate. The estimated annual suicides in Nepal are 6,840 or 24.9 suicides per 100,000 people. Data on suicide in Nepal are primarily based on police reports and therefore rely on mortality statistics. However, the burden of suicide in communities is likely to be higher, particularly among women, migrant workers, and populations affected by disasters.

== Prevalence ==
According to reports from the Nepal Police, the average annual increase in suicide over the past five years was 7% which increased to 14% in 2021. Due to the lack of community-based screening, national suicide surveillance systems, and integrated networks, the population burden of suicide in Nepal can be challenging to determine.

The increasing trend in suicide is a major public health concern in Nepal. Often suicide indicates an underlying mental health problem or acute stress. Increased access to timely and effective mental health services is associated with a decreased risk of suicide. However, there are several barriers to accessing high- quality mental health services in Nepal including stigma, lack of human resources as well as medical infrastructure to provide care. The government of Nepal spends less than 1% of its total healthcare budget on mental health. Nepal has a rural population of over 78% population, but the mental health resources are unequally distributed and highly concentrated in larger urban areas. While there have been some improvements in increasing awareness and access to mental health care through nonprofit organizations, government initiatives, and telehealth, over 90% of people with mental health problems do not receive any access to treatment. As a result, despite the significant public health burden, suicide remains largely neglected and underreported.

Apart from underlying mental health disorders, suicide is often linked to acute and chronic stress. Particularly in Asian countries like Nepal, the risk has been associated with economic hardships and sociocultural factors. Nepal experienced a decade long internal conflict that led to over 17,000 deaths and significant impact on the infrastructure. While the conflict led to a peace agreement in 2007 the country continues to face economic and political unrest. Nepal's exposure to other crisis such as the devastating earthquake of 2015 and seasonal disasters like flood and landslide continues to ripple the economic hardships leading to accumulated stress and risk to suicide.

More recently, the COVID 19 pandemic resulted in an unprecedented economic crisis in the country and Nepal faces as all time high unemployment rate. A study comparing suicide rates in Nepal Pre-Covid pandemic period and during the pandemic period saw an overall increase in the monthly suicide rate. The increase was observed both among males and females and was highest in two provinces with high poverty rates. Some studies conducted in the aftermath of the destructive 2015 earthquake showed an increased risk of suicidal ideation as well as other mental health problems like depression and hazardous alcohol use all of which are associated with suicide, others have shown a decreasing trend. Epidemiological studies conducted in humanitarian contexts face several challenges like the use of non-validated items and cutoff scores and lack of baseline data for comparison leading to discrepancies in prevalence estimates. Despite the lack of accurate data from Nepal, the association between poverty, unemployment, economic recessions as well as exposure to a humanitarian crisis and suicide has been well established.

== Gender ==
Globally, the suicide rate among men is four times higher than among females. While suicide- related mortality is more among men, females demonstrate a higher rate of suicide attempts. Similar trends can be observed in Nepal with over 57% of deaths among males. However, Nepal has a relatively high ratio for female to male suicide ranking17th for male suicide and 3rd for female suicide rate in the world. Three-year data of death by suicide obtained from the Nepal police records show that the trends of suicide have consistently been on increasing trend. Compared to 5509 deaths in 2018, there were over 6900 deaths in 2020. The increase in trend can be seen in males and females and within all seven provinces. Drawing on evidence from research on suicide, various socio-cultural factors contribute to the elevated suicide rates among men and women.

Suicide is the single largest leading cause of death for women of reproductive age (15-49) in Nepal. Studies have consistently demonstrated that suicide incidence is higher among younger age group and married women. It is estimated that women in Nepal attempt suicide three times more than men do. Most risk factors are linked with sociocultural factors and gender equity including interpersonal conflict, marital dispute, relationship problems and social exclusion. Studies indicate that 60% of women who died by suicide were found to have undergone physical abuse three months prior to their suicide.

=== Sexual minorities ===
Gender and sexual minorities including men who have sex with men and transgender individuals have a higher risk of experiencing suicidality compared to their heterosexual counterparts. Transgender communities in Nepal are particularly vulnerable and discriminated against and experience physical abuse and harassment on the streets as well as in public settings and schools. As a result of the structural and social barriers, transgender persons and men who have sex with men experience a high risk of suicidal ideation. To date, there have been no studies on gender and sexual minorities and their mental health in Nepal. However, evidence from larger literature suggests an increased risk of experiencing suicide ideation and attempts in the community. Further, local news reports have highlighted the risk faced by gender and sexual minorities in Nepal following the death of a highly acclaimed cinema director.

== Migrant workers ==
More than 1000 migrant workers from Nepal die each year in the Middle East and Malaysia. While most of the deaths are associated with workplace hazards including heart failure and heat stroke, 12% of the deaths are due to suicide. Suicide related deaths among the migrant workers have been associated with a financial burden. According to the Ministry of Labor, Employment and Social Security in the Government of Nepal, labor migration contributed to over 7.5 billion USD remittance inflow in the country making up 23% of Nepal's gross domestic product. Reports on labor migration suggest that factors affecting the mental health of migrant workers include forced labor, exploitative working conditions and contract fraud. In addition to being at risk of experiencing mental health problems, the migrant workers are also less likely to report their health needs due to lack of health and job protection, financial stress and communication barriers. Since 2008, more than 1100 migrant workers have died by suicide and the numbers have consistently been on the rise. According to the same reports by labor migration, in 2008 there were 8 reported deaths by suicide compared to 98 in 2021/2022. During the height of covid pandemic in 2020, the second leading cause of death among migrant workers in Malaysia was suicide.

== Methods ==
The commonly used methods for suicide in Nepal is hanging and poisoning by consumption of pesticides. Historically, pesticide poisoning has caused more than 14 million deaths from suicide and are widely used means till date in countries like India, Bangladesh, South Korea, and Nepal. More than 60% of the population in Nepal directly engaged in agriculture making pesticides the preferred means of suicide. Studies based on police data show that hanging is more common, however community-based studies show that consuming pesticide is more rampant. The discrepancies have often been attributed to the fact that hanging could be a lethal means and since police data are based on mortality it's likely that they are reported more to the police. Among 5754 suicides in 2018-19, 24% of deaths were attributed to poisoning and ingestion of highly concentrated agricultural pesticides. Similarly, data from major hospitals in Nepal have reported that more than 90% of poisoning or ingestion of pesticides was a direct result of suicide attempt. A large scale study on suicide data from 1980 to 2019 reported Methyl-parathions as the key pesticide responsible for poisoning. While the substance was banned in Nepal in 2006 it remains one of the main agent leading to pesticide related suicide.

== Underreporting and perceived criminalization ==
According to the WHO, the availability and quality of data on suicide are globally poor and underestimated. Lack of integrated repository with reliable data on suicide and misclassification deaths due to fear and stigma often leads to underreporting. In Nepal, data related to suicide are often acquired through fatality reports which directly overlooks the true impact at the community level.

The stigma around suicide and the perceived criminalization of suicide are other barriers that may lead to underreporting. A common misconception in the Nepali diaspora is that suicide is criminalized. Suicide has never been considered a criminal offense. The abetment of suicide, on the other hand, is a criminal offense in Nepal. The belief that suicide is a punishable offense and that people attempting suicide are subject to imprisonment and fines prevents people from accurate reporting. Socio-culturally, suicide is seen as a sign of a weakness and lack of ability to face problems. Often, the act of suicide brings shame to the surviving family. Experts argue that the criminalization of suicide is a result of social stigma rather than a legal issue. Suicide- related deaths involve police for investigation which may further contribute to the fear of criminality and hesitancy in reporting. Lawmakers and mental health experts have emphasized the importance of changing public perception surrounding criminality to encourage accuracy in suicide reporting.

== Media reporting of suicide ==
The WHO has guidelines to promote sensible media reporting on topics related to suicide but they are widely underutilized. Studies conducted in Australia have demonstrated that sensible and quality reporting has a positive impact on suicide-related behaviors including significant reduction of suicide. A study comparing news reports published in Nepal with WHO's guidelines showed that over 97% of articles violated the guidelines and included at least one potentially harmful information. Helpful suicide-related content like including supportive helplines, mentioning information about suicide prevention and warning signs were seldom reported.

== Government prevention and control efforts ==
Nepal has made deliberate efforts to reduce suicide. Given the high suicide rate due to the consumption of concentrated agricultural pesticides, the Nepali government started pesticide regulation in 2001. In 2019 the government set up designated communities within the federal structure to implement pesticide management acts including regulation, deregistration, and banning of pesticides. While the rate of death by pesticides continues to be high, the incidence of pesticide self-poisoning has been relatively low. Despite these efforts, the majority of hospitals in the country are unable to collect precise information on pesticides and often resort to misclassification. To assess the impact of pesticide use, gauge the effectiveness of regulatory policies, and establish evidence-based protocols, there is an increasing need to enhance health systems' capacity to identify and report pesticides accurately.

The non-government sector and non-profits have been at the forefront of leading suicide prevention efforts. The WHO has prioritized suicide prevention as part of its Mental Health Action Plan for 2013-2020 (now extended to 2030) to reduce suicide by at least one-third. Similarly, the Nepal Government Sustainable Development Goals Target of 2015-2030 aims to reduce the suicide rate from 16.5 to 4.7 per 100,000. As part of the short-term strategy, WHO in collaboration with a non-profit (Transcultural Psychosocial Organization or TPO Nepal) operationalized a suicide prevention helpline service. A longer-term goal for the WHO is to create a national resource center for suicide prevention at Patan /hospital. As part of its suicide prevention strategy, the hospital has also been operating a 24-hour crisis helpline.

Koshish Nepal (non-profit) engages with the federal and local governments to advocate for mental health prevention and treatments. Their efforts in suicide prevention include raising awareness through sensitization programs, training female community health volunteers, and advocating with the Supreme Court for the development and integration of a multisectoral suicide prevention plan. Additionally, Koshish operates a toll-free helpline for mental health support across four different provinces in Nepal.

Health Foundation Nepal in 2020 conducted a feasibility study of mental health crisis helpline services. Results identified several gaps in the implementation including the need to increase the workforce of the service providers, the need for continued training among healthcare workers, and creating a systematic information management system. Similarly, a Delphi expert study conducted in 2020 recommends the need to improve suicide data reporting and increase access to evidence-based services in suicide. Despite the efforts, there was a sharp increase to 24.5 in the suicide rate in the year 2020-21 highlighting the urgent need to prioritize nation-wide suicide prevention strategies.
