= Suicide in Finland =

Suicide in Finland takes place at a higher rate than the European Union average. The number of annual suicides peaked at more than 1500 in 1990, and has been decreasing relatively evenly since then, although a slight recent increase in 2016 and 2017. In 2018, 810 Finns died by suicide.

In 2020, a total of 717 suicides occurred.

== See also ==
- Finno-Ugrian suicide hypothesis
