= Suicide in Ukraine =

Suicide in Ukraine is a common cause of unnatural death and a serious social issue. In 2009, Ukraine ranked 13th in the world by its total suicide per 100,000 people. Suicide is Ukraine's most common type of injury death.

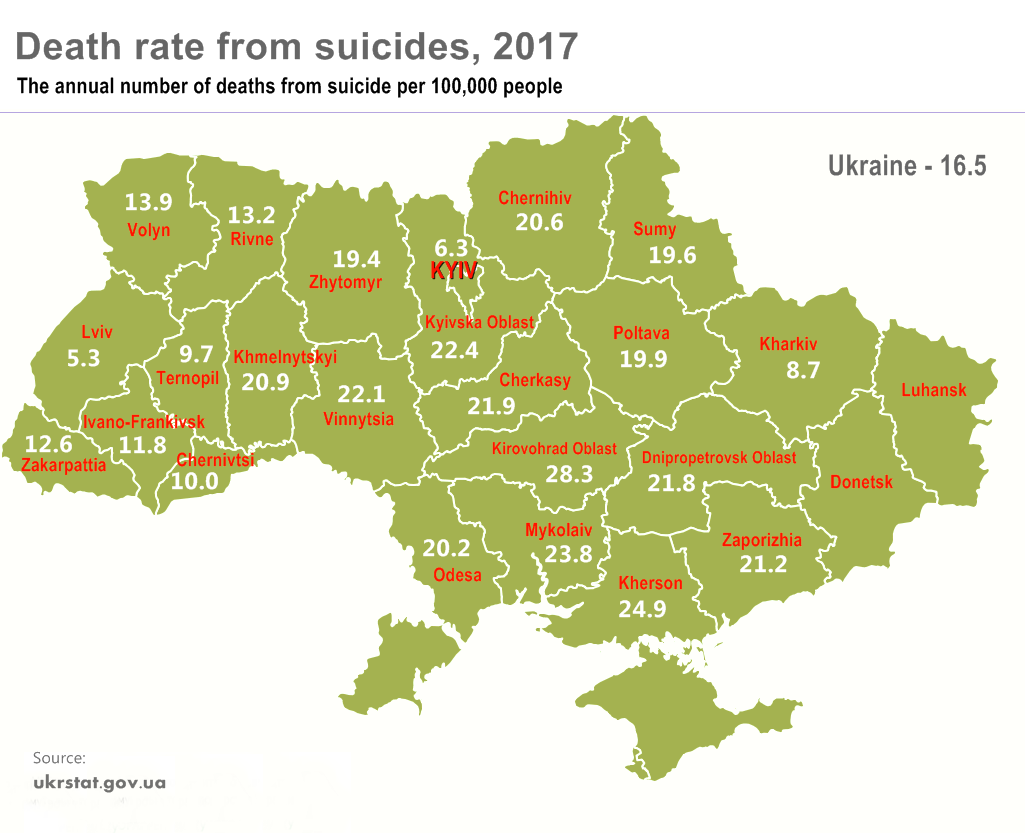
Death rate from suicides per 100.000 people in Ukraine's subdivision except Crimea and Donbas

== Statistics ==
Suicide rates (per 100,000), by gender, Ukraine, 1981-2009
Gender	1981	1985	1990	1995	2000	2005	2009
Male	40.8	37.7	34.6	50.2	52.1	40.9	37.8
Female	9.3	9.1	8.7	9.6	10.0	7.0	7.0
Total	23.7	22.3	20.7	28.4	29.6	22.6	21.2
Source: World Health Organization

Number of suicides by age group and gender. Ukraine, 2009
Age (years)	5-14	15-24	25-34	35-44	45-54	55-64	65-74	75+	All
Males	34	906	1504	1423	1710	1020	862	532	7992
Females	19	148	186	216	286	243	313	313	1724
Total	53	1054	1690	1639	1996	1263	1175	845	9716
Source: World Health Organization

== Suicide in Ukrainian army ==
Suicide was a leading cause of death in Ukrainian Army in 2012, before the beginning of the Russia-Ukraine war, causing 18% to 50% of all deaths, because of underfunding and neglect. Long-lasting psychogenic disorders caused by difficulties with Army lifestyle, inability to adopt to the environment and the stress of life are the primary reasons of suicides.

Multicenter Study on Parasuicides did a 1-year monitoring of suicidal behavior among Ukrainian soldiers based on World Health Organization guidelines. The study revealed–

- Average age of suicide attempters was 19.9 years.
- 65% of suicide attempts required hospital treatment, others needed outpatient examination.
- Frequent suicide attempt methods included–
  - Hanging (54.5%)
  - Cutting (27.3%)
  - Jumping from high places (9.1%)
  - Overdose of barbiturates or other sedative drugs (9.1%).

Share of deaths from suicide, OWID

== Notable Ukrainians who committed suicide ==
- Oleksandr Kovalenko, professional footballer, died via suicide by jumping from his apartment
- Vasyl Yevseyev, footballer and coach, suicide by jumping
- Mykhailo Chechetov, politician, deputy head and chief whip of Party of Regions, suicide by jumping from his apartment

== Suicide prevention ==
The Ukrainian Government and different national and international organizations make individual attempts and initiatives to prevent suicides in Ukraine. Various associations provide help and suggestions to people who are trying to die by suicide.

Association	Address	Way to contact	Hotline	Hours
Telephone of confidence "Stavropyghion-058" Lviv	PO Box 1067 1290000, LVIV	Phone	058	Everyday 00:00 - 23:00
Odesa		1) Face to face 2) Phone	0487 327715, 0482 226565	Mon, Tues, Wed, Thurs, Fri: 10:00 - 08:00, Sat, Sun: 19:00 - 08:00
Source: Suicide.org
