= Suicide in Pakistan =

Suicide in Pakistan is a major public health issue.

== Comparison ==
Pakistan's suicide rate is below the worldwide average. The 2015 global rate was 9.5 per 100,000 people Suicides represent some 0.9% of all deaths.

Pakistan's death rate, as given by the World Bank, is 7.28 per 1000 people in 2015. In 2015, the suicide rate in Pakistan was approximately 9 deaths per 100,000 inhabitants, slightly below the global average. Similarly, suicides represent 0.9% of all deaths. Pakistan's healthcare system is fragile, and mental health resources are severely limited. Consequently, the country has witnessed a disturbing surge in suicide rates over the past few years, as highlighted by numerous reports.

== Culture ==
Diagnosing and covering suicide cases is generally difficult due to social stigma and legal issues that envelop the problem. Suicide is prohibited in Islam. Various obstacles restrict open discussion of the phenomenon.

Attempting suicide used to be a criminal offence under the Pakistan Penal Code, with punitive laws imposed for attempted suicide punishable by a fine of Rs10,000 and/or imprisonment. However, there was an amendment in 2022 which decriminalized attempted suicide.

In May 2026, the Federal Shariat Court struck down the 2022 legislation and restored Section 325 of the Pakistan Penal Code and recriminalized attempted suicide.

National suicide statistics are not compiled on a formal level nor officially reported to the World Health Organization. Unofficial data is neglected and subject to underreporting. While suicide patterns have traditionally been low, the rate has increased steeply.

One analysis of suicide reports over a period of two years, showed over 300 suicide deaths in Pakistan in 35 different cities. The findings showed that males outnumber females by a 2:1 rate, and that the majority of male suicides tended to be unmarried; the rate for females is the opposite. Research indicated that the majority of female suicides were under age 30 and that "domestic problems" were the main stated reason. These include unemployment, health issues, poverty, homelessness, family disputes, depression and a range of social pressures.

Hanging, use of insecticides, and firearms are the most common methods for carrying out suicide in Pakistan.
