= Suicide in Nigeria =

Nigeria has one of the highest suicide rates in Africa. According Deputy Director, Medical Social Services, Lagos University Teaching Hospital, LUTH, and training coordinator, Suicide Research Prevention Initiative, SUPRIN, Dr. Titilayo Tade, the suicide rate in Nigeria in 2019 is 6.9/ 100,000, which is higher than 6.5 rate in 2012; but under-reported or miscoded.

== Legislation ==
For every 100,000 people in Nigeria, according to the World Health Organization, there are 9.5 suicides. Suicide is a crime in Nigeria, according to Section 327 of the Criminal Code Act, punishable by one year in prison. Section 326 of the same Criminal Code states that a person will be charged with a felony or liable to life imprisonment if he or she aids, counsels, procures another to kill himself. On February 15, 2022, House of Representatives made a strong move to replace one-year jail term with community service and counselling as punishment for attempted suicide

== Prevention ==
The Nigerian government has banned Sniper, an insecticide commonly used for suicides. Lagos University Teaching Hospital, LUTH, in March 2017 established the Suicide Research & Prevention Initiative and Staff Emotional Care Services, SURPIN/SECS in response to the increasing spate of suicide in the country. A day has been set aside to observe the mental health and reasons for suicide. 10 September marks "World suicide prevention day", a series of programs line up to strengthen the need for preventing suicide globally. The media has an important role to play in circulating information regarding health especially as it known to promote health literacy
