= Mental health in Puerto Rico =

Puerto Rico has been in economic crisis for a long time due to its unpayable debt. As of 2015 it is 72 billion dollars. The mounting debt has caused much damage to the society in question. Cutbacks on a lot of necessities in the island have caused a health care problem. In the mental health care, the problem grows bigger as people find themselves unemployed or with lack of good jobs a lot of people have left the island, causing a lack of professionals.

== Description ==
With a large number of people migrating from Puerto Rico to find better jobs an opportunity, professionals and students are lacking. This greatly impacts the mental healthcare of the public, with a lack of people and funds to pay professionals, leaving those who are in need, to suffer. This leaves the mental health care specialized areas severely limited.

== Suicides ==
The suicide rate in Puerto Rico is high with it being one of the top 15 causes of death in the island. A study shows that people with chronic illnesses are likely to think about, and attempt suicide. 25% of all suicides attempts are committed by people with chronic illness.

Suicide ideation is high among people with depression and active depression symptoms. Socioeconomic issues were linked to increased suicide attempts or ideation by education, those without a college degree were more likely to think about or commit suicide.

== Mental illness ==
The professionals in charge of treating mental illness lack training in suicide prevention is also a problem. In Puerto Rico, 60% of children live in poverty.

== Research ==
According to research and statistics, men tend to be violent when unemployed. It threatens their masculinity and to re-ensure power and control, they would physically and mentally abuse their wife or significant others.

Thereafter, women and men both lack the potential and qualification to retain a job. The stress of experiencing poverty and the lack of financial support impacts executive functions. In the case of poverty, people are prone to experience depression, stress, addiction, low self-esteem and suicide. As mentioned above, suicide records in Puerto Rico reached a high 25% before the 20th century. In the aftermath of Hurricane Maria, researchers and ‘The Commission for the Prevention of Suicide’ reported a 16% increase. Approximately, a suicide per day since 2016.

== Study ==
Daniel C. Marston, a cognitive and behavioral psychologist, conducted a study on the ‘Neurobehavioral and psychological effect on poverty’. Marston's findings distinguish the differences poverty has on adults, children, families and new moms. As stated, the psychological effects with poverty causes depression, anxiety and suicidal thoughts. Marston's study states that adults in poverty display higher levels of withdrawal symptoms, somatic complaints and pervasive negative thinking. Adults are impacted by feeling worried and anxious about what how handle the situation. In contrast, children are impacted by feeling a sense of helplessness and lack of control. Children are more likely to experience developmental delays, attention problem and disciplinary problems.

== Factors ==
In addition, factors such as poverty, lack of resources, malnutrition and environmental factors significantly impacts a fetus physical development and executive functions. They are in higher risks to develop ADHD and autism. Newborn babies are troubled by lack of proper functions, such as communicating and socializing.

== 1985 study ==
The first epidemiological study the status of mental health in Puerto Rico in 1985, shows that 165,497 people suffer from serious conditions in a population of 3,187,671. Many of the participants suffered from mental, emotional and behavioral conditions, while many remained silent. Quoting the research, facilities accepted and treated those with serious and disabling conditions and not to those who, despite also suffering from mental illnesses, are still considered "functional." One out of every 10 Puerto Rican, since 1985, have suffered from anxiety and panic disorder, mood disorders and depression. Some experienced a combination of disorders.

Daniel C. Marston concluded, "lack of access to appropriate care due to economic crisis, traditionally identified as in main reason why people in poverty do not receive services to help address neuro-behavioral problems." Overall the economic crisis in Puerto Rico negatively affects all aspects of life but the mental healthcare system is an important aspect of this.
