= Suicide in Saudi Arabia =

As of 2016, the Kingdom of Saudi Arabia had a suicide rate of 3.4 per 100,000 people, ranked 163rd in the world.

== Legislation ==
Suicide is a crime in Saudi Arabia.

== By group ==
=== Women ===
Discrimination, severe social restrictions, and forced marriages are motivators for women's suicides.

=== Migrants ===
In a study conducted in the Dammam region, the suicide rate was found to be disproportionately higher for migrants.

== By method ==
A study of 221 suicides in Dammam between 1986 and 1995 revealed that 63% were by hanging, 12% were by jumping from height, 9% were by gunshot, and 6% were by poisoning.
