= Stransham-Ford v Minister of Justice =

2015 South African court case on assisted suicide

- Court: North Gauteng High Court
- Full case name: Robert James Stransham-Ford v Minister of Justice and Correctional Services and Others
- Decided: 30 April 2015 (order); 4 May 2015 (reasons)
- Citation: [2015] ZAGPPHC 230
- Transcript: Judgment on SAFLII

Case history
- Prior action: Urgent application to the High Court
- Subsequent actions: Later appealed to the Supreme Court of Appeal (SCA), which set aside the High Court order after Stransham-Ford's death
- Related action: South African Law Commission Report on Euthanasia (1998)

Court membership
- Judge sitting: Hans J. Fabricius

Case opinions
- Decision by: Fabricius J

Keywords
- assisted suicide; euthanasia; constitutional law; South African law

Stransham-Ford v Minister of Justice and Correctional Services (case no. 27401/15) was a 2015 judgment of the North Gauteng High Court in South Africa. It was the first South African case to address the constitutionality of physician-assisted suicide and euthanasia.

== Background ==
Robert James Stransham-Ford, a 65-year-old advocate, was diagnosed with terminal stage 4 cancer and given only weeks to live. He applied to the High Court in Pretoria for an order permitting a medical doctor to assist him in ending his life without facing criminal or professional liability. He argued that his suffering, which included severe pain, loss of mobility, and loss of dignity, infringed his constitutional rights.

== Legal arguments ==
The applicant relied on provisions of the South African Constitution, including:

- Section 7: the duty of the state to respect, protect, promote and fulfil rights.
- Section 10: the right to human dignity,
- Section 12: the right to freedom and security of the person, including control over one's body

He argued that the common law prohibition on assisted suicide unjustifiably limited these rights. His counsel compared assisted suicide to the lawful withdrawal of life-sustaining treatment and cited international precedents such as Carter v Canada (2015).

The state opposed the application, arguing that assisted suicide remained unlawful under South African law and that recognising such a right raised ethical, social, and medical concerns.

== Judgement ==
On 30 April 2015, Justice Hans Fabricius ruled in favour of Stransham-Ford, declaring that:

- A mentally competent, terminally ill adult who had freely chosen to end his life with medical assistance was constitutionally entitled to do so.
- A doctor assisting under those circumstances would not act unlawfully or face prosecution.
- The common law prohibition of assisted suicide was unconstitutional insofar as it imposed an absolute ban, as it unjustifiably limited rights to dignity and bodily integrity.

Stransham-Ford died on the day of the order, before the judgment was formally delivered.

In 2016, the Supreme Court of Appeal overruled the High Court's decision, holding that the matter had become moot because the applicant had died before the judgment was delivered. The court ruled that the case was not an appropriate vehicle for developing the common law on murder and culpable homicide, and it upheld the appeal by the Minister of Justice. As a result, the High Court's order did not stand, and the case did not establish a legal precedent for the authorisation of assisted dying in South Africa.

== Impact ==
The judgment was widely regarded as a landmark in South African law. It raised questions about whether the legislature should regulate assisted dying, building on earlier recommendations by the South African Law Commission's 1998 report on euthanasia.

While the order applied to a specific case and did not constitute a general legalisation of assisted suicide, it drew attention to the constitutional balance between the right to life and the right to dignity. The decision has been noted in comparison with similar cases in Canada, Europe, and the United States.
