= Suicide in Uruguay =

Suicide in Uruguay accounted for 823 deaths in 2022, reaching the highest suicide rate ever recorded in the country at 23.3 deaths per 100,000 people. The government response included offering antidepressants at no cost.

== See also ==
- Outline of Uruguay
- List of countries by suicide rate
