= Suicide in Mexico =

This article documents suicide in Mexico.

As of 2016, the suicide rate in Mexico was 5.2 per 100,000 people, ranking it 147th in the world. This is an increase from 2.2 in 1990.

== By group ==
=== Men ===
The suicide rate is higher for men (8.7) than women (2.2) by almost 396%.

=== Immigrants ===
Borges et al 2009 found that "Risk for suicidal ideation was higher among Mexicans with a family member in the United States, Mexican-born immigrants who arrived in the United States at 12 years or younger, and US-born Mexican Americans than among Mexicans with neither a history of migration to the United States nor a family member currently living there. Risk for suicide attempts was also higher among Mexicans with a family member in the United States."

== Suicide tourism ==
A number of people come to Mexico for access to Pentobarbital, a drug used for euthanasia.
