= South African Depression and Anxiety Group =

South African mental health support group

- Abbreviation: SADAG
- Established: 1994
- Founder: Zane Wilson
- Founded at: Johannesburg, South Africa
- Type: Non-Profit Organisation
- Purpose: Mental Health
- Headquarters: Catherine St, Johannesburg, 2000, South Africa
- Region served: South Africa
- Board of directors: Zane Wilson; Dr. Frans A Korb; Dr. Colinda Line; Nkini Phasha; Kevin Bolan; Zamo Mbele; Dr. Dora Wynchank; Dr. Jan Chabalala
- Volunteers: 100 (2010)
- Website: sadag.org

The South African Depression and Anxiety Group (SADAG) is a South African non-profit mental health organisation that provides support, education, advocacy, and counselling services nationwide. Founded in 1994, the organisation operates national helplines, support groups, and public awareness programmes across South Africa.

== History ==
SADAG was founded in 1994 in Johannesburg by Zane Wilson.It began as a support group for individuals living with panic disorder and anxiety.

During the late 1990s and 2000s, SADAG expanded its services to include national toll-free helplines for depression, anxiety, and suicide crisis support.

In 1997, the organisation launched rural outreach initiatives aimed at increasing mental health awareness in underserved communities. In 2018, SADAG opened a provincial office in Durban, KwaZulu-Natal.

By the 2020s, SADAG reported operating more than 30 national helplines, including 24-hour suicide crisis lines and digital support services via SMS and WhatsApp.

== Activities ==
=== Helplines and Crisis Support ===
SADAG operates national helplines providing free and confidential support for individuals experiencing depression, anxiety, trauma, substance use challenges, and suicidal ideation. Services include telephone-based counselling, crisis intervention, and referral to mental health professionals.

=== Support Groups ===
The organisation facilitates community-based and online support groups across South Africa.

In 2025, SADAG launched targeted online support groups for educators experiencing burnout, young adults, and persons with disabilities. Reported figures on the number of support groups range between approximately 180 and 250 nationwide.

=== Education and Public Awareness ===
SADAG conducts school and workplace mental health awareness programmes and suicide prevention initiatives. It has also highlighted youth substance use issues during public awareness campaigns.

=== Digital Initiatives ===
The organisation expanded its digital service delivery during the COVID-19 pandemic. During the national lockdown period (March 2020 – February 2021), SADAG reported receiving more than 500,000 calls for assistance, including over 100,000 calls to its suicide helpline.

== Reception and Public Response ==
SADAG has been cited in South African media reporting on mental health trends and service demand.

During the COVID-19 pandemic, Bhekisisa reported increased demand for mental health helplines, including those operated by SADAG. In 2025, TimesLIVE and The Herald reported on anxiety among matric learners and quoted SADAG representatives on examination-related stress and youth mental health concerns.

In the same year, Jacaranda FM reported that funding constraints placed pressure on SADAG’s crisis helpline services, raising broader concerns about the sustainability of non-profit mental health support in South Africa.

== Organisation ==
SADAG is headquartered in Sandton, Johannesburg, with additional regional presence in KwaZulu-Natal and the Western Cape. It collaborates with government departments and participates in national mental health advocacy structures, including initiatives associated with the South African Federation for Mental Health.
