= Suicide in Kazakhstan =

Suicide in Kazakhstan is a very common cause of unnatural death in the country and a long term social issue. According to the 2020 report of World Health Organization, suicides account for 2.76% of total deaths in Kazakhstan. Suicide of teenaged and young aged people is a big issue in the country. In the age group of 15-49 year olds, suicide makes up for 12.2% of all deaths in Kazakhstan.

== Statistics ==
The country has highest number of recorded suicides among girls aged 15 to 19, and for boys, it is the second highest after Russia. A UNICEF report of 2009 shows, between 1999 and 2008 the number of suicides among young people of the country increased by 23%.

According to Raisa Sher, head of the country's education ministry's child protection committee, there are several factors behind such high rates of suicide among people of a young age, such as:

- School bullying
- Absence or loss of values
- Falling standards of social behavior
- Alienation

Number of suicides by age group, Kazakhstan, 2008 & 2015 comparison
Age (years)	5-14	15-24	25-34	35-54	55-74	75+	All
2008	85	896	1012	1395	476	133	4009
2015	43	439	711	1137	428	114	2872
Change	-49.4%	-51.0%	-29.7%	-18.5%	-10.1%	-14.3%	-28.4%
Source: World Health Organization

Number of suicides by age group and gender. Kazakhstan, 2008
Age (years)	5–14	15–24	25–34	35–44	45–54	55–64	65–74	75+	All
Males	66	657	860	656	522	240	143	86	3241
Females	19	239	152	120	97	52	41	47	768
Total	85	896	1012	776	619	292	184	133	4009
Source: World Health Organization

== Youth suicide ==
According to UNICEF and World Health Organization data, Kazakhstan has the highest suicide level among people aged 15 to 19 in the world. Kazakhstan was 2nd worldwide for suicide among teenage boys, and 1st among suicide for teenage girls.

According to a UNICEF study conducted in five Kazakhstani cities with 1700 teenagers, social issues, family problems and a lack of support were among the main reasons for teenage suicide. According to the study, Kazakhstani parents spend only 20 minutes of 'quality time' with their children a day.
