= Suicide in Lithuania =

Suicide in Lithuania has become a significant social issue in the country due to its high rate. Since its peak in 1995, the suicide rate in Lithuania has been constantly decreasing, but as of 2021 it still remains the highest in the EU and the second highest in the OECD (after South Korea).

The suicide rate as of 2022 was 18.6 suicides per 100,000 persons.

== Causes ==
In the 1990s, after the fall of communism, Lithuania experienced dramatic social and economic changes. Earlier studies attributed high suicide rate to the effects of these major transformations in the society, harsh economic conditions, declining living conditions, alcoholism as well as lack of psychological and psychiatric services. More recent studies suggest that the causes might be more complex.

According to Onutė Davidonienė, the director of the State Mental Health Center, there are psychological and economic reasons behind the high suicide rate, including: economic recessions, alcoholism, lack of tolerance in the society, bullying.

Kalėdienė et al. noted that the suicide rate is significantly higher amongst the less educated and especially rural populations. The suicide rates differ significantly between certain municipalities. The suicide rate in Kupiškis district municipality (over 70 out of 100,000 people) is more than two times higher than the national average as of 2017. Other municipalities with particularly high suicide rates are Varėna district municipality and Kalvarija Municipality (67 out of 100,000 people). In contrast, the numbers were the most modest in Palanga City Municipality (less than 15 out of 100,000 people), followed by Vilnius City Municipality and Plungė district municipality (15 out of 100,000 people respectively).

There is a striking difference between male and female suicide rates in Lithuania. Baranov et al. suggested that the traditional masculinity norms, associated with excessive drinking and stigma of seeking psychological help, may contribute to suicidal behaviours. Several studies on relationship between the religiosity and suicide did not provide a conclusive insight on the causes of high rate.

A statistical-econometrical study by Comunale (2020) found that the main factors which may be linked to suicides are: GDP growth, demographics, alcohol consumption, psychological factors and weather. The same study noted that among the EU countries, Lithuania seems to be one of the most introverted populations, significantly more than Latvian and Estonian populations.

A report published in 2017 by the Suicide Prevention Bureau in Lithuania noted that the suicide rate amongst the prisoners and arrested individuals is several times higher than the country average. The same report noted the insufficient availability of psychological services and a lack of suicide prevention in many municipalities.

== Prevention ==
In 2007, the Lithuanian parliament approved the National Mental Health Strategy based on the WHO Mental Health Declaration for Europe 2005. The country also adopted the Suicide Prevention Action Plan 2016–2020. In 2015, the Suicide Prevention Bureau (Lithuanian: Savižudybių prevencijos biuras) was established under the State Mental Health Centre. In 2017, however, the National Audit Office of Lithuania concluded that there is still no comprehensive system to provide help for the individuals at risk of suicide.

== Statistics ==
Suicide rates (per 100,000), by gender, Lithuania
Gender	1981	1985	1990	1995	2000	2005	2010	2015	2019	2022
Male	59.4	58.0	44.3	79.1	75.6	68.1	56.1	51.7	36.1	32.2
Female	10.7	12.9	9.7	15.6	16.1	12.9	9.6	8.9	6.2	6.7
Total	33.6	34.1	26.1	45.6	44.1	38.6	31.3	28.9	20.2	18.6
Source: World Health Organization

Number of suicides by age group and gender. Lithuania, 2022
Age (years)	10–14	15–19	20-24	25-44	45–59	60-74	75+	All
Males	1	3	21	105	116	125	55	426
Females	1	3	4	16	26	25	26	101
Total	2	6	25	121	142	150	81	527
Source: The Institute of Hygiene of Lithuania

== See also ==
- List of countries by suicide rate
