= Age adjustment =

Technique used to compare populations with different age profiles

In epidemiology and demography, age adjustment, also called age standardization, is a technique used to allow statistical populations to be compared when the age profiles of the populations are quite different.

== Example ==
For example, in 2004/5, two Australian health surveys investigated rates of long-term circulatory system health problems (e.g. heart disease) in the general Australian population, and specifically in the Indigenous Australian population. In each age category over age 24, Indigenous Australians had markedly higher rates of circulatory disease than the general population: 5% vs 2% in age group 25–34, 12% vs 4% in age group 35–44, 22% vs 14% in age group 45–54, and 42% vs 33% in age group 55+.

However, overall, these surveys estimated that 12% of all Indigenous Australians had long-term circulatory problems compared to 18% of the overall Australian population.

== Standard populations ==
In order to adjust for age, a standard population must be selected. Some agencies which produce health statistics also publish standard populations for age adjustment. Standard populations have been developed for specific countries and regions. World standard populations have also been developed to compare data from different countries, including the Segi World Standard and the World Health Organization (WHO) standard. These agencies must balance between setting weights which may be used over a long period of time, which maximizes comparability of published statistics, and revising weights to be close to the current age distribution. When comparing data from a specific country or region, using a standard population from that country or region means that the age-adjusted rates are similar to the true population rates. On the other hand, standardizing data using a widely used standard such as the WHO standard population allows for easier comparison with published statistics.

== See also ==
- Controlling for a variable – Binning data according to measured values of the variable
- Simpson's paradox – Error in statistical reasoning with groups
