= Suicide in Russia =

Social problem in Russia

Suicide in Russia is a significant national social issue, with the suicide rate at 21.4 suicides per 100,000 people. In 2021, the suicide rate in Russia was 10.7 per 100,000 people, according to national sources, down from 39.1 in 2000 and 41.4 in 1995. Since 2002, the number of suicides has fallen in each consecutive year and has dropped to its lowest level in more than 50 years (in 1965, the number of suicides was 27,158).

== History ==
In the Russian Empire and for a long time in the USSR, a complete record of suicides was not kept. The studies covered individual cities or regions and later the urban population. In 1956, under Nikita Khrushchev, the USSR began to collect data on suicides for the entire population of the country. In May 1985, Mikhail Gorbachev came to power, and the anti-alcohol campaign with partial prohibition began almost simultaneously. For a couple of years, the number of suicides fell by 34.5% from 29.6 to 19.4 per 100,000 inhabitants, but the deterioration of the socio-economic situation of the country by the end of the 1980s reversed the trend.

The dissolution of the Soviet Union, market reforms, the First Chechen War, and falling incomes among the population resulted in an increase in suicide mortality, reaching peak levels in 1994 and 1995.

During the last years, as a consequence of the change in the culture of alcohol consumption in the country, Russians began to consume more beer, wine, and other drinks with less alcohol. The decline in strong and popular vodka sales is similar to the decrease in the number of suicides in the country.

At the end of 2015, suicide rates rated as high were recorded in 37 of the 85 regions. These are, above all, the regions in the north, the Urals, Siberia, and the Russian Far East. The highest suicide rates were in the Altai Republic, the Transbaikal, the Jewish Autonomous Oblast, Buryatia, and the Nenets Autonomous Okrug, with large indigenous populations. Eighteen regions have a suicide rate classified as low, including the two main cities of Russia: Moscow and Saint Petersburg.

Suicides in Russia since peak in 1995
	1995	2000	2010	2015	2016	2017	2018	2019	2021
Number of suicides	61000	56934	33480	25476	23119	20278	18206	16983	15748
Per 100 000 population	41.4	39.1	23.4	17.4	15.8	13.8	12.4	11.6	10.7

Suicide rate per 100 000 population

View chart definition.

== Alcohol and suicide ==
Heavy alcohol use is a significant factor in the suicide rate, with an estimated half of all suicides correlated with alcohol abuse. Russia's suicide rate has declined since the 1990s, alongside per capita alcohol consumption, despite the economic crisis since then; therefore it is believed that alcohol consumption is more of a factor than economic conditions.

== See also ==
- Suicide of Renata Kambolina
- Suicide of Gleb Korablyov
- Blue Whale Challenge, an online suicide game invented in Russia allegedly linked to many youth suicides worldwide
- Federal law of Russian Federation no. 139-FZ of 2012-07-28, which introduced censorship of Web pages containing information about methods of suicide, and calls for suicide
- Suspicious Russia-related deaths since 2022, including many reported suicides
