= List of countries by past life expectancy =

Life expectancy since 1770 by region of the world

This is a list of countries showing past life expectancy, ranging from 1950 to 2015 in five-year periods, as estimated by the 2017 revision of the World Population Prospects database by the United Nations Population Division. Life expectancy equals the average number of years a person born in a given country is expected to live if mortality rates at each age were to remain steady in the future. The life expectancy is shown as the average of males and females.

== List of countries 1950 to 2015 (United Nations) ==
Asterisk (*) indicates "Health in LOCATION" links.

Life expectancy at birth for both genders (in years)
Location	1950–1955	1955–1960	1960–1965	1965–1970	1970–1975	1975–1980	1980–1985	1985–1990	1990–1995	1995–2000	2000–2005	2005–2010	2010–2015
Afghanistan *	28.61	31.12	33.41	35.58	37.83	40.39	43.56	47.70	51.74	54.17	56.89	60.03	62.25
Albania *	55.26	59.31	64.85	66.24	67.69	69.70	70.61	71.98	71.73	72.95	74.83	75.65	77.66
Algeria *	42.89	45.00	47.29	49.47	51.48	54.93	61.57	65.85	67.20	69.14	71.50	73.88	75.27
Angola *	31.39	32.54	34.09	36.04	38.05	40.00	40.89	41.48	42.22	44.73	49.98	55.59	60.19
Antigua and Barbuda *	58.51	61.03	63.18	65.05	66.71	68.18	69.54	70.75	71.88	73.00	74.02	75.01	75.82
Argentina *	62.57	64.58	65.31	65.84	67.28	68.72	70.21	71.06	72.20	73.33	74.39	75.18	76.01
Armenia *	62.82	64.92	67.04	69.18	70.75	70.58	70.90	68.40	68.07	70.21	72.35	72.72	73.98
Aruba (Netherlands)	60.44	64.36	66.58	68.22	70.05	71.55	72.87	73.30	73.54	73.70	73.97	74.68	75.37
Australia *	69.37	70.42	70.87	70.83	71.75	73.58	75.08	76.18	77.69	78.84	80.34	81.48	82.30
Austria *	66.54	68.02	69.66	70.14	70.80	72.14	73.28	75.00	76.16	77.54	78.93	80.14	80.99
Azerbaijan *	58.43	60.40	61.53	62.62	63.53	63.93	64.40	65.21	64.55	66.24	67.43	70.09	71.57
Bahamas	60.02	61.97	63.69	65.22	66.63	67.92	69.09	70.21	71.13	71.68	73.17	74.33	75.14
Bahrain *	42.98	48.46	55.25	61.09	65.35	68.33	70.50	71.83	72.90	73.93	74.91	75.68	76.41
Bangladesh *	40.67	44.22	47.19	49.32	46.27	52.21	54.30	56.97	59.99	63.74	66.70	69.05	71.24
Barbados *	57.22	59.84	62.17	64.59	66.35	67.96	69.47	70.77	71.92	72.94	73.75	74.55	75.36
Belarus *	60.71	66.32	69.11	70.37	70.51	70.41	70.14	71.35	69.44	67.42	67.83	69.25	72.15
Belgium *	67.81	69.46	70.30	70.71	71.50	72.66	73.91	75.27	76.41	77.39	78.38	79.58	80.53
Belize *	55.92	58.64	61.34	64.26	66.72	68.63	70.35	71.45	70.56	68.58	68.51	69.52	69.76
Benin *	33.72	36.13	38.42	40.87	43.48	46.22	48.30	51.92	55.14	54.96	56.18	58.56	59.93
Bhutan *	32.26	33.78	35.47	38.20	41.06	43.69	47.39	50.98	54.81	58.58	62.91	66.54	68.78
Bolivia *	40.02	41.39	42.95	44.72	46.69	48.86	51.22	53.78	56.47	59.27	62.11	64.95	67.72
Bosnia and Herzegovina *	53.67	58.46	61.93	64.73	67.57	69.87	70.72	71.95	70.13	73.61	74.83	75.53	76.31
Botswana *	47.67	49.71	51.61	53.37	56.07	59.32	61.75	62.54	59.86	51.31	49.15	56.52	62.91
Brazil *	50.83	52.99	55.54	57.99	60.13	61.33	62.72	64.40	66.33	68.90	71.10	72.91	74.66
Brunei *	58.28	61.02	63.82	65.95	67.83	69.45	70.91	72.28	73.53	74.68	75.74	76.69	76.71
Bulgaria *	62.33	66.78	70.28	70.91	71.07	71.10	71.24	71.39	71.11	70.97	72.19	73.13	74.25
Burkina Faso *	30.94	33.29	35.59	38.04	40.28	43.40	48.40	49.48	49.33	49.86	51.61	55.27	58.71
Burundi *	39.03	40.52	42.03	43.53	44.23	46.43	48.03	49.16	47.30	50.85	51.97	53.67	56.09
Cambodia *	40.32	41.05	41.39	41.97	37.84	14.48	45.08	52.04	54.27	56.42	60.79	65.12	67.61
Cameroon *	38.54	40.45	42.68	44.85	47.42	50.06	52.06	52.79	51.25	49.34	51.45	54.39	56.39
Canada *	69.05	70.31	71.34	72.15	73.01	74.32	75.86	76.83	77.75	78.58	79.70	80.76	81.78
Cape Verde *	48.06	48.77	49.45	52.43	55.25	60.52	62.37	64.10	65.73	67.94	71.27	71.77	72.14
Central African Republic *	33.44	35.50	37.57	40.16	43.90	47.62	49.56	49.49	47.65	44.96	43.68	45.99	49.40
Chad *	36.06	37.36	38.70	40.14	42.52	43.98	45.38	46.64	47.14	47.65	47.65	48.87	51.67
Guernsey and Jersey * (UK)	69.22	70.46	70.92	71.60	72.07	72.87	74.04	74.94	76.08	77.00	78.27	79.63	80.57
Chile *	54.64	56.38	58.32	60.83	63.95	67.38	70.57	72.70	74.56	76.10	77.38	78.14	78.83
China *	43.83	44.47	44.55	55.47	61.67	65.51	67.75	68.92	69.67	70.86	73.11	74.68	75.67
Colombia *	50.67	55.20	57.98	60.11	61.80	64.03	66.90	68.04	68.70	70.34	71.71	72.86	73.75
Comoros *	38.72	40.47	42.47	44.48	46.85	49.06	52.29	55.29	57.82	59.29	59.60	60.89	62.83
Costa Rica *	56.00	58.76	62.37	65.18	67.70	70.49	73.42	75.09	76.08	77.04	77.81	78.42	79.16
Croatia *	61.26	63.64	65.72	67.46	69.02	69.90	70.59	71.88	72.81	74.58	74.94	76.09	77.05
Cuba *	59.44	62.39	65.39	68.53	71.02	73.14	74.29	74.69	74.83	76.22	77.21	78.67	79.16
Curaçao * (Netherlands)	60.65	64.35	66.50	68.17	69.93	72.17	73.67	74.46	74.57	74.59	74.99	76.15	77.78
Cyprus *	66.73	68.72	70.43	71.90	73.17	74.27	75.26	76.14	76.93	77.66	78.33	78.96	79.92
Czech Republic *	66.86	69.59	70.35	69.99	70.04	70.64	70.78	71.46	72.50	74.23	75.54	76.98	78.17
DR Congo *	39.06	40.55	41.63	42.99	44.77	45.63	47.13	48.25	49.59	48.89	51.84	55.48	58.10
Denmark *	71.06	72.07	72.40	72.93	73.63	74.24	74.44	74.75	75.23	76.14	77.34	78.59	80.15
Djibouti *	41.04	42.95	45.18	47.35	50.90	52.55	54.67	56.12	57.02	57.02	57.29	59.05	61.62
Dominican Republic *	45.97	49.92	53.61	56.95	59.87	62.05	64.02	66.53	69.04	70.08	71.12	72.23	73.23
Ecuador *	48.65	51.59	54.75	56.78	58.90	61.67	64.57	67.63	70.18	72.10	73.62	74.57	75.55
Egypt *	41.14	46.35	49.30	51.58	52.96	56.76	59.90	63.54	65.44	67.98	68.99	69.87	70.84
El Salvador *	44.25	48.12	51.57	53.92	55.75	56.22	57.14	61.55	66.08	68.04	69.60	71.15	72.64
Equatorial Guinea *	34.48	35.99	37.49	38.99	40.50	42.04	45.54	47.21	49.35	51.75	53.57	54.93	56.84
Eritrea *	34.08	36.68	40.08	42.15	44.11	45.91	47.33	48.68	50.77	53.96	56.68	60.70	63.42
Estonia *	61.77	66.92	69.38	70.31	70.27	69.43	69.32	70.34	68.50	69.42	71.59	73.77	76.76
Eswatini *	41.44	43.47	45.05	46.69	49.61	52.61	56.15	59.66	59.44	52.50	45.93	48.41	54.99
Ethiopia *	34.08	36.68	40.08	42.14	43.52	44.26	43.52	46.15	48.06	50.70	53.61	59.08	63.69
Federated States of Micronesia *	54.58	56.58	58.58	60.58	62.67	64.77	65.35	65.93	66.49	67.06	67.58	68.35	68.79
Fiji *	52.21	54.70	56.92	58.93	60.71	62.23	63.67	64.93	66.05	67.07	67.96	68.79	69.72
Finland *	66.40	68.19	69.07	69.72	70.93	72.71	74.33	74.79	75.84	77.14	78.40	79.55	80.70
France *	67.05	69.20	70.66	71.33	72.32	73.50	74.63	75.94	77.20	78.29	79.44	80.82	81.89
French Guiana (France)	53.33	56.16	59.50	64.40	65.78	66.50	69.21	71.09	72.75	74.24	76.12	77.98	79.18
French Polynesia (France)	48.94	54.86	57.10	59.26	61.03	62.82	66.28	67.98	69.47	71.46	73.17	75.01	76.14
Gabon *	37.00	39.00	40.50	44.65	48.78	52.91	57.03	60.70	61.01	60.03	59.07	61.34	64.45
Gambia	30.24	31.52	32.79	35.78	40.04	44.21	48.20	51.33	52.85	54.91	56.92	58.83	60.31
Georgia *	60.65	62.65	64.65	66.65	68.15	69.64	69.63	70.45	70.11	71.09	72.60	72.65	72.74
Germany *	67.52	68.91	69.97	70.66	71.15	72.30	73.65	74.99	75.99	77.32	78.63	79.74	80.45
Ghana *	42.17	44.66	46.90	48.62	50.03	51.60	53.05	55.31	57.75	56.98	57.49	60.03	61.68
Greece *	65.75	67.15	69.25	70.10	71.81	72.83	74.50	75.63	77.39	78.08	79.11	80.02	80.62
Grenada *	56.34	58.91	61.12	63.00	64.58	65.93	67.11	68.12	69.01	69.83	70.89	72.00	73.17
Guadeloupe (France)	53.32	57.15	60.57	63.59	66.22	68.62	70.79	72.77	74.61	76.30	77.87	79.36	80.54
Guam * (USA)	57.20	59.72	62.25	64.59	66.69	68.49	70.01	71.35	72.55	74.10	75.92	77.35	78.84
Guatemala *	42.92	45.46	48.01	50.93	53.97	56.19	58.41	60.99	63.61	66.56	68.95	70.51	72.44
Guinea *	33.07	34.33	35.38	36.14	37.43	39.87	43.05	47.92	51.28	51.61	51.31	55.45	57.93
Guinea-Bissau *	35.88	37.19	38.63	40.60	42.48	44.49	46.60	48.18	49.99	51.81	52.68	54.18	56.00
Guyana *	58.83	59.80	60.69	61.55	61.95	62.30	62.66	63.00	63.69	64.53	65.24	65.79	66.25
Haiti *	37.48	40.62	43.53	46.22	48.10	50.07	51.65	53.73	55.43	57.13	58.34	60.23	62.29
Honduras *	41.80	44.60	48.03	51.07	54.12	57.74	61.62	65.49	67.77	69.92	71.05	72.01	72.89
Hong Kong * (UK/China)	63.10	65.85	68.83	70.85	72.48	73.73	75.63	76.97	78.05	79.99	81.44	82.43	83.41
Hungary *	64.01	66.91	68.79	69.45	69.41	69.59	69.08	69.42	69.41	70.88	72.54	73.74	75.40
Iceland *	72.23	73.22	73.50	73.65	74.20	76.34	76.85	77.61	78.53	79.11	80.69	81.40	82.19
India *	36.62	39.65	42.73	46.02	49.39	52.54	54.93	56.73	59.18	61.57	63.54	65.57	67.57
Indonesia *	43.49	47.00	50.20	53.09	55.93	58.46	60.66	62.38	64.16	65.78	66.68	67.67	68.60
Iran *	40.58	43.50	46.38	49.18	52.67	56.71	51.99	59.97	66.87	69.04	71.12	72.73	75.06
Iraq *	37.93	44.92	50.88	56.36	59.51	61.72	59.00	64.32	67.39	69.07	68.88	68.02	69.19
Ireland *	66.90	69.16	70.14	70.76	71.23	72.00	73.18	74.22	75.34	76.03	77.83	79.69	80.86
Israel *	68.88	70.04	70.98	71.77	72.58	73.53	74.63	75.94	77.22	78.32	79.56	80.94	81.91
Italy *	66.52	68.44	69.68	70.93	72.22	73.55	74.87	76.38	77.47	78.80	80.28	81.51	82.35
Ivory Coast *	32.14	35.09	38.64	41.64	45.79	49.24	51.59	52.77	51.44	46.68	49.19	51.70	54.37
Jamaica *	58.61	62.73	65.72	67.61	69.01	70.73	72.03	72.12	72.01	72.07	72.79	74.19	75.45
Japan *	62.80	66.41	69.16	71.41	73.28	75.40	77.01	78.53	79.42	80.51	81.80	82.66	83.28
Jordan *	46.51	50.66	54.60	58.38	61.85	64.94	67.23	69.15	70.41	71.27	72.17	73.01	73.81
Kazakhstan *	55.06	57.31	59.50	61.66	63.25	64.29	65.88	67.49	65.45	62.98	64.55	66.03	69.06
Kenya *	42.30	44.73	48.02	50.75	53.68	56.32	58.76	58.62	55.94	52.38	52.73	59.72	65.40
Kiribati *	46.38	47.99	50.63	53.03	55.54	56.64	57.33	59.14	61.59	63.32	64.55	65.10	65.69
Kuwait *	53.55	58.26	62.02	64.88	67.07	68.71	70.32	71.63	72.42	72.95	73.34	73.71	74.29
Kyrgyzstan *	52.83	55.08	57.35	59.57	61.25	62.38	64.03	66.06	66.24	65.93	66.87	67.49	70.27
Laos *	40.93	42.43	43.98	45.48	48.40	49.89	52.37	54.85	57.53	60.34	63.15	65.40	67.17
Latvia *	62.40	67.57	70.07	70.46	69.99	68.92	69.08	70.41	67.68	68.70	70.75	71.55	73.92
Lebanon *	60.46	62.43	64.01	65.36	66.70	67.59	68.36	69.55	71.04	73.23	75.57	77.73	78.94
Lesotho *	42.15	45.08	47.80	48.52	49.80	52.24	55.28	57.33	59.70	52.74	45.62	49.04	52.51
Liberia *	33.13	34.19	35.39	37.92	40.78	44.52	46.97	47.33	47.68	52.59	52.39	58.11	60.70
Lithuania *	60.83	66.88	69.88	71.28	71.19	70.67	70.53	71.57	69.73	70.25	71.62	71.86	73.99
Luxembourg *	65.96	67.55	69.12	69.78	70.24	71.45	72.89	74.49	75.77	76.99	78.32	79.51	81.15
Libya *	36.67	38.99	46.88	53.31	58.39	62.46	65.55	67.52	69.35	70.18	70.81	71.82	71.47
Macau * (China)	61.00	63.58	66.00	68.09	70.66	73.06	74.83	76.56	78.05	79.78	80.99	82.06	83.29
North Macedonia *	54.90	58.96	62.12	65.02	67.31	68.46	68.91	70.67	71.54	72.65	73.78	74.17	75.15
Madagascar *	36.32	38.75	41.17	43.54	45.97	48.08	49.66	49.92	52.66	56.68	60.02	62.23	64.50
Malawi *	36.26	37.21	38.42	39.50	41.76	43.78	45.57	46.31	46.67	46.56	47.30	53.38	60.71
Malaysia *	54.80	57.94	60.88	63.34	65.44	67.24	68.78	70.11	71.27	72.30	73.21	73.71	74.73
Maldives *	34.47	36.09	38.98	42.42	46.24	50.66	55.49	59.29	63.53	67.63	72.15	75.59	76.30
Mali *	26.96	27.98	28.61	30.79	34.20	37.71	41.55	44.51	46.57	46.75	49.96	54.03	56.24
Malta *	66.11	67.83	69.34	70.73	72.02	73.22	74.38	75.49	76.54	77.53	78.49	79.42	80.31
Martinique (France)	55.59	58.87	61.86	64.63	67.28	69.70	71.88	73.86	75.69	77.38	78.95	80.09	81.19
Mauritania *	38.59	41.72	45.19	47.93	50.28	52.73	55.76	57.77	58.89	59.84	60.27	61.32	62.64
Mauritius *	50.19	55.74	61.23	62.96	63.55	65.58	68.10	68.49	70.28	70.36	72.09	72.75	74.13
Mayotte (France)	47.20	52.77	57.03	60.69	63.85	66.59	68.99	71.15	73.11	74.87	76.49	77.96	79.34
Mexico *	50.72	55.30	58.50	60.32	62.61	65.34	67.76	69.86	71.85	73.72	74.94	75.72	76.49
Moldova *	59.04	61.07	62.87	64.64	65.17	65.15	65.10	67.53	67.30	66.60	67.62	68.25	70.95
Mongolia *	43.18	46.10	50.73	53.87	56.43	56.85	57.30	59.60	60.75	61.81	64.08	66.14	68.47
Montenegro *	59.77	62.11	65.61	68.35	71.27	72.52	73.62	74.17	74.73	73.40	73.40	74.19	76.39
Morocco *	45.67	47.45	49.52	51.64	53.53	55.74	59.58	63.19	65.98	67.65	69.95	72.88	74.87
Mozambique *	31.29	33.79	36.18	38.14	40.37	42.21	41.47	42.33	43.90	47.21	49.56	53.24	56.08
Myanmar *	44.20	49.62	51.88	53.98	55.95	57.83	55.95	57.83	59.63	61.28	62.94	64.26	66.01
Namibia *	41.75	45.27	48.43	51.20	53.52	56.63	58.34	60.67	61.52	58.11	53.83	54.98	61.75
Nepal *	34.01	34.56	36.20	39.08	42.02	44.93	48.34	52.13	56.43	60.50	64.04	66.79	68.91
Netherlands *	71.93	72.94	73.46	73.64	74.11	75.17	76.13	76.72	77.26	77.85	78.68	80.18	81.31
New Caledonia (France)	50.74	54.60	58.03	61.05	63.69	66.03	68.08	69.88	71.45	72.83	74.07	75.12	76.26
New Zealand *	69.76	70.68	71.18	71.26	71.77	72.62	73.78	74.46	76.35	77.58	79.08	80.32	81.33
Nicaragua *	42.30	45.45	48.68	51.99	55.29	57.65	59.50	62.23	66.16	68.53	70.96	72.84	74.47
Niger *	34.50	34.81	35.29	35.62	36.32	37.75	40.26	42.27	45.01	48.36	51.42	54.91	58.53
Nigeria *	33.81	35.80	38.13	39.97	42.03	44.29	46.02	45.95	45.87	46.00	46.94	49.75	51.88
North Korea *	37.60	49.88	51.63	57.24	61.73	65.04	67.06	68.59	70.02	63.49	68.06	68.44	70.79
Norway *	72.80	73.48	73.47	73.92	74.43	75.31	76.01	76.28	77.29	78.30	79.34	80.61	81.61
Oman *	36.05	40.54	44.71	48.55	52.25	57.35	61.90	65.60	68.43	70.98	73.20	75.02	76.21
Pakistan *	37.04	42.73	47.49	51.25	54.14	56.11	57.76	59.30	60.76	62.08	63.33	64.37	65.86
Palestine	46.59	48.23	50.75	54.09	57.45	60.99	64.40	67.11	68.85	70.29	71.17	72.03	72.86
Panama *	56.80	59.50	62.15	64.36	66.74	69.22	70.99	72.38	73.55	74.60	75.54	76.36	77.32
Papua New Guinea *	38.31	40.93	43.04	46.87	50.12	53.71	57.12	58.07	59.72	61.10	62.59	64.18	64.97
Paraguay *	62.76	63.33	64.50	65.08	65.96	66.55	67.11	67.64	68.54	69.44	70.80	71.79	72.78
Peru *	43.93	46.30	49.14	51.52	55.55	58.53	61.59	64.33	66.79	69.31	71.65	73.19	74.20
Philippines *	55.43	57.09	58.62	60.08	61.41	61.67	62.87	64.70	65.70	66.78	67.49	68.04	68.61
Poland *	61.44	65.89	68.31	69.79	70.28	70.35	70.70	70.73	71.15	72.72	74.60	75.56	76.99
Portugal *	60.30	62.37	64.46	66.37	68.32	70.39	72.51	74.03	74.88	75.99	77.58	79.29	80.51
Puerto Rico * (USA)	63.54	67.92	69.12	70.72	72.35	73.52	73.89	74.59	73.83	74.87	76.78	77.84	79.21
Qatar *	55.19	59.16	62.89	66.60	69.70	71.80	73.36	74.51	75.34	75.96	76.57	76.90	77.64
Congo *	43.15	46.83	50.16	52.49	54.11	55.44	56.63	56.66	54.83	51.99	52.12	57.95	62.55
Romania *	61.15	63.29	67.78	67.34	69.02	69.59	69.73	69.52	69.60	69.71	71.47	73.08	74.85
Russia *	58.51	64.79	67.88	68.47	68.31	67.56	67.46	69.13	66.58	65.70	64.95	67.13	70.30
Rwanda *	40.02	41.51	43.02	44.13	44.58	45.79	49.79	48.07	23.72	44.74	50.58	60.05	65.16
Réunion * (France)	47.84	53.41	57.70	61.41	64.58	67.28	69.64	71.73	73.60	75.29	76.81	78.21	79.53
Saint Lucia *	52.42	55.25	59.36	61.57	64.49	67.38	69.94	70.70	71.31	71.15	72.07	73.97	74.81
Saint Vincent and the Grenadines *	51.08	55.14	60.77	63.94	65.82	66.61	68.39	69.60	70.49	70.61	70.71	71.85	72.74
Samoa *	45.93	48.47	50.99	53.49	56.00	58.51	60.98	63.49	66.14	68.39	70.09	72.04	74.09
São Tomé and Príncipe *	46.40	48.89	51.86	54.42	57.36	60.21	60.59	61.40	62.22	63.01	63.80	65.47	66.14
Saudi Arabia *	41.94	44.42	46.98	50.23	55.45	60.78	64.89	67.86	69.98	71.75	72.92	73.21	73.99
Senegal *	35.47	37.49	38.62	38.41	40.91	46.50	51.27	56.05	57.59	57.25	58.93	62.41	65.71
Serbia *	59.12	61.60	64.26	66.72	68.53	69.53	70.20	71.14	71.74	71.91	72.36	73.33	74.65
Seychelles *	57.96	59.41	62.84	64.39	66.99	69.02	70.33	71.14	70.54	71.36	72.11	72.32	72.95
Sierra Leone *	28.82	29.87	30.99	32.63	36.78	39.70	40.85	39.13	35.96	36.69	41.32	45.88	50.19
Singapore *	60.17	63.95	66.44	67.20	69.06	71.04	72.89	74.95	76.97	77.67	79.20	81.23	82.34
Slovakia *	64.43	68.64	70.63	70.32	70.08	70.48	70.63	70.97	71.61	72.74	73.82	74.77	76.30
Slovenia *	65.60	67.88	69.15	69.17	69.81	70.97	71.21	72.69	73.74	75.26	76.66	78.55	80.31
Solomon Islands *	45.38	47.91	50.43	52.97	55.50	58.00	58.74	55.84	58.33	61.46	64.67	67.35	69.60
Somalia *	33.99	35.99	37.97	39.99	41.91	43.78	45.48	46.37	44.96	49.80	51.49	53.18	54.86
South Africa *	48.52	51.27	53.02	54.84	56.69	57.34	58.35	61.00	62.25	59.20	53.84	53.06	59.47
South Korea *	47.92	51.23	54.83	58.78	63.09	64.99	67.38	70.34	72.85	74.95	77.17	79.47	81.27
South Sudan *	27.92	30.59	32.72	34.88	36.70	38.68	39.45	41.81	45.32	48.17	50.19	52.30	55.06
Spain *	64.60	67.75	69.91	71.37	72.65	74.40	76.10	76.85	77.62	78.76	79.90	81.22	82.52
Sri Lanka *	54.51	58.29	60.26	62.92	65.15	66.96	69.09	68.91	70.01	69.06	73.22	74.09	74.64
Sudan *	44.54	47.08	49.22	51.24	53.06	54.00	54.46	55.14	56.00	57.58	59.37	61.51	63.59
Suriname *	55.99	58.69	60.52	62.42	63.99	65.11	66.53	67.13	67.59	67.80	68.05	69.63	70.90
Sweden *	71.86	72.90	73.50	74.12	74.79	75.35	76.40	77.16	78.17	79.30	80.13	81.07	81.89
Switzerland *	69.34	70.71	71.58	72.57	73.71	75.19	76.09	77.23	77.94	79.23	80.50	81.79	82.69
Syria *	47.60	50.52	53.49	56.85	60.79	64.22	67.18	69.63	71.28	72.54	73.53	74.46	69.84
Tajikistan *	53.05	55.10	57.19	59.26	60.84	62.06	63.19	64.10	62.31	64.48	66.44	68.70	70.38
Taiwan *	58.16	62.92	65.00	66.91	69.38	70.77	72.12	73.35	74.40	75.18	76.90	78.17	79.24
Tanzania *	41.25	43.03	44.31	45.83	47.70	49.90	50.64	50.86	49.61	50.06	53.65	58.82	62.78
Thailand *	50.81	53.30	56.05	58.19	60.66	63.32	65.75	69.77	70.15	70.30	71.22	73.15	74.56
Timor-Leste *	29.97	32.48	34.98	37.49	39.95	31.18	39.91	46.45	50.46	56.99	61.47	66.38	67.74
Togo *	35.30	38.66	41.89	45.02	48.07	50.93	53.58	55.41	55.78	53.71	53.88	55.80	59.07
Tonga *	58.63	60.47	62.30	64.01	65.63	66.84	68.10	69.25	69.85	70.74	71.15	71.82	72.51
Trinidad and Tobago *	57.89	60.82	64.09	64.77	65.45	66.66	67.26	67.74	68.21	68.42	68.67	69.26	70.23
Tunisia *	38.81	40.73	43.74	48.33	54.08	59.37	64.26	67.13	70.27	72.38	73.70	74.56	75.04
Turkey *	41.01	43.69	47.22	50.78	53.75	57.05	60.22	63.04	65.49	68.49	71.37	73.37	74.83
Turkmenistan *	51.28	53.41	55.51	57.61	59.17	60.22	61.77	62.83	62.69	63.18	64.22	65.87	67.31
Uganda *	40.00	42.60	45.39	48.12	49.14	49.33	49.05	46.86	44.57	44.98	49.92	55.15	58.61
Ukraine *	61.83	67.11	69.69	70.66	70.57	69.65	69.15	70.55	68.72	67.36	67.46	67.89	71.12
United Arab Emirates *	43.86	49.59	54.70	59.60	63.37	66.40	68.83	70.72	72.23	73.58	74.82	75.90	76.71
United Kingdom *	69.40	70.60	71.03	71.71	72.21	73.01	74.20	75.14	76.25	77.18	78.42	79.69	80.97
United States *	68.71	69.67	70.10	70.37	71.42	73.26	74.38	74.90	75.65	76.49	77.18	78.17	78.88
U.S. Virgin Islands	62.88	65.49	66.82	68.30	69.80	71.15	72.28	73.57	74.81	76.06	77.06	77.85	79.10
Uruguay *	66.14	67.15	68.38	68.60	68.81	69.64	71.02	72.17	73.07	74.27	75.35	76.20	76.96
Uzbekistan *	56.07	57.90	59.75	61.60	63.02	63.99	65.29	66.56	66.26	66.71	67.74	69.10	70.80
Vanuatu *	41.94	44.94	47.94	50.86	53.78	56.77	59.79	61.93	64.20	66.41	68.36	69.99	71.36
Venezuela *	54.84	57.77	60.68	63.27	65.72	67.37	68.72	69.47	70.23	71.62	72.82	73.36	73.95
Vietnam *	53.50	57.26	60.49	62.33	57.76	66.12	68.06	69.79	71.24	72.66	73.81	74.70	75.56
Western Sahara *	35.48	37.40	39.29	41.23	43.26	47.57	51.88	56.20	58.75	61.27	63.87	66.21	68.41
Yemen *	34.70	34.70	34.71	39.14	43.29	48.08	53.03	56.76	58.52	59.84	61.00	62.75	64.17
Zambia *	42.07	44.13	46.08	47.83	50.16	51.47	50.31	46.74	43.79	43.53	46.86	52.93	59.73
Zimbabwe *	48.54	50.59	52.48	54.13	55.78	57.84	60.54	60.18	54.66	47.35	44.13	48.35	57.64
NORTH AMERICA	68.73	69.70	70.20	70.51	71.56	73.34	74.51	75.08	75.85	76.68	77.41	78.41	79.17
LATIN AMERICA	51.27	54.17	56.78	58.93	61.15	63.01	64.88	66.66	68.41	70.45	72.13	73.45	74.66
Central America	49.10	53.25	56.47	58.62	61.06	63.60	65.91	68.29	70.54	72.50	73.87	74.85	75.78
Caribbean	52.05	55.27	58.35	61.01	63.04	64.46	65.53	66.84	67.73	68.93	69.97	71.30	72.45
South America	51.94	54.36	56.69	58.78	60.94	62.63	64.46	66.09	67.78	69.90	71.74	73.20	74.51
EUROPE	63.68	67.12	69.21	70.04	70.62	71.05	71.64	72.83	72.65	73.11	73.79	75.29	77.20
Northern Europe	68.87	70.49	71.18	71.85	72.35	73.04	74.04	74.91	75.65	76.66	77.94	79.17	80.53
Western Europe	67.74	69.35	70.49	71.11	71.81	72.98	74.20	75.49	76.54	77.73	78.94	80.19	81.07
Southern Europe	63.75	66.26	68.24	69.79	71.30	72.74	74.07	75.32	76.22	77.48	78.76	80.03	81.09
Eastern Europe	60.36	65.52	68.40	69.03	69.16	68.75	68.65	69.80	68.31	67.83	67.91	69.52	72.22
AFRICA	37.46	39.95	42.32	44.42	46.51	48.66	50.45	51.72	51.71	52.33	53.67	56.97	60.23
Northern Africa	42.27	45.82	48.60	51.12	53.18	56.27	59.77	62.85	64.56	66.39	67.92	69.63	71.07
Sub-Saharan Africa	36.33	38.51	40.73	42.70	44.80	46.75	48.18	49.11	48.86	49.39	50.70	54.29	57.88
Western Africa	33.55	35.50	37.61	39.50	41.80	44.42	46.71	47.67	48.13	48.21	49.30	52.33	54.74
Middle Africa	36.91	38.45	40.01	41.82	43.99	45.57	47.07	47.96	48.46	48.17	50.79	54.42	57.42
Eastern Africa	37.00	39.45	42.06	44.13	45.96	47.55	48.17	48.86	47.58	49.57	51.98	57.04	61.45
Southern Africa	47.81	50.58	52.43	54.23	56.10	57.01	58.21	60.79	61.94	58.47	53.19	52.99	59.31
ASIA	42.33	44.54	46.50	52.81	56.51	59.33	61.57	63.57	65.16	66.69	68.65	70.34	71.81
Western Asia	43.76	46.93	50.14	53.78	57.01	60.23	62.57	65.38	67.26	69.19	70.85	72.03	72.77
Central Asia	54.67	56.73	58.77	60.74	62.26	63.29	64.70	66.09	65.06	64.39	65.82	67.50	69.76
Southern Asia	37.02	40.26	43.43	46.64	49.36	52.74	54.83	57.02	59.65	61.95	63.99	65.93	67.88
Eastern Asia	45.60	46.64	46.97	57.03	62.86	66.52	68.70	69.90	70.78	71.93	74.19	75.74	76.76
Southeast Asia	46.48	49.97	52.84	55.52	56.67	58.08	61.95	64.20	65.69	67.02	68.13	69.36	70.50
OCEANIA	61.58	63.37	64.40	65.41	66.87	68.67	70.43	71.43	73.04	74.19	75.67	77.02	77.93
Australia/New Zealand	69.44	70.46	70.92	70.92	71.75	73.41	74.85	75.88	77.46	78.63	80.11	81.28	82.14
Polynesia	50.39	53.90	56.08	58.31	60.29	62.26	64.81	66.72	68.50	70.13	71.58	73.20	74.53
Melanesia	40.50	43.27	45.54	49.14	52.20	55.47	58.43	59.20	60.78	62.19	63.67	65.21	66.12
Micronesia	53.50	55.43	57.69	59.79	61.92	63.50	64.60	65.98	67.55	69.39	70.92	71.95	72.81
World	46.98	49.33	51.17	55.48	58.14	60.30	62.06	63.68	64.59	65.67	67.20	69.07	70.79

== List of countries before 1950 ==
Life expectancy at birth (both genders)
Country	1543	1683	1771	1810	1830	1851	1860	1870	1882	1890	1895	1900	1905	1910	1915	1920	1925	1930	1935	1940	1949
Australia											52.95		57.00			59.32	63.16	64.89	65.09	66.29	69.13
Austria							34.40	34.40				41.73									63.42
Argentina									33.10	34.00	33.30	39.00	39.70	44.20	46.20	48.65	50.60	52.55	54.45	56.45	64.36
Bangladesh								25.50													
Belarus												36.20									
Belgium						41.88	45.07	40.90		44.09	45.43	46.52	49.92	51.31		53.59	57.09	57.10	59.93	55.94	65.43
Bolivia												28.00		28.00		31.00	33.00	33.00		36.00	
Brazil												29.00		31.00		32.00		34.00		37.00	
Bulgaria												40.20	43.30					48.30			57.94
Canada						41.06	41.60	42.56				48.42				52.14	59.23	58.91	62.40	63.96	67.59
China																		32.00			41.00
Chile												29.00		30.00				35.00		38.00	
Colombia												29.00		31.00		32.00		34.00		38.00	
Costa Rica												32.00		33.00		37.00		42.00		49.00	
Cuba												32.00	34.16	36.00	36.29	39.00	38.76	42.00	44.57	45.00	
Cyprus											38.51		45.00		47.47		48.46				
Czech Republic												40.27		44.31				55.55			
Denmark			33.00			44.49	45.05	45.97		47.24	50.83	51.87	54.31	58.03	58.38	57.56	61.91	62.27	62.86	66.25	70.13
Egypt																		35.40	33.20	34.40	36.70
El Salvador																28.00				36.00	
Estonia												43.10							56.27		
Finland				35.80		35.10	32.10	41.57	40.40	44.45	47.58	41.74	45.99	48.49	49.50	47.53	53.39	55.16	57.36	46.60	61.86
France				40.05	39.59	41.77	43.32	36.69	43.08	43.32	45.13	45.01	48.30	51.33	36.25	51.53	54.33	56.83	58.29	49.55	64.89
Germany											42.38		45.45		40.52		57.42		61.50		67.25
Greece									37.10	38.50						44.65		51.56		54.34	61.54
Guatemala												24.00		24.00		25.00		25.00		29.00	
Guyana																		41.42			
Honduras																29.00		34.00		36.00	
Hungary												37.34		39.76		42.06		50.21			61.29
Iceland						30.07	19.77	38.34	17.76	36.58	52.48	46.65	49.50	52.65	53.64	54.56	58.29	60.25	59.47	65.77	71.43
India									25.44	24.27		23.49	23.98	23.15	24.02	24.86	27.61	29.31	30.95	32.59	35.84
Italy								29.70	34.29	38.53	39.64	41.67	43.90	46.71	42.49	45.47	51.27	55.16	56.20	56.95	64.11
Jamaica									40.10	34.30	37.10	37.80	37.60	36.70	37.00	35.40	38.90	45.30	44.00	47.60	53.90
Japan							36.43	36.59	37.04	37.68	38.10	38.60	39.22	39.97	40.90	42.04					57.71
Kazakhstan							23.58	23.59				28.10		30.60					48.24	42.47	54.34
Lithuania												41.70					50.50				
Luxembourg													46.21	49.66	51.47	54.62	54.79	56.80	59.10	61.95	64.84
Mexico											29.52	25.00	26.80	28.00		34.00	32.10	34.00	40.40	39.00	45.80
New Zealand																					68.95
Netherlands						39.99	36.92	37.32	43.74	44.36	46.63	48.38	52.05	55.10	57.20	57.79	63.12	64.67	66.50	65.40	70.28
Nicaragua																24.00		28.00		34.00	
Norway						49.72	49.98	50.58	47.37	48.61	52.79	52.47	55.10	57.99	58.16	58.86	62.51	64.00	65.83	65.88	71.53
Portugal																				51.39	55.34
Paraguay												25.00		29.00		33.00		38.00		42.00	
Peru																				37.00	
Panama																		36.00	39.60	42.00	
Russia												30.50				20.50	35.20	36.50		41.20	55.00
Sri Lanka																			46.30	45.20	55.50
Spain									29.50	31.80		34.80		40.78	42.97	39.22	46.88	49.26	52.64	48.44	60.96
Slovakia																		49.90			
Sweden				31.97	40.96	43.58	48.44	44.97	48.53	50.44	54.13	52.21	54.50	57.76	57.17	58.78	62.55	63.18	64.85	66.72	70.79
Switzerland									42.98	44.95	46.85	47.48	49.66	52.93	55.90	54.33	59.92	61.47	62.10	63.54	67.94
Uruguay												49.00		52.00		52.00		50.00		58.00	61.00
Ukraine												36.60								49.80	60.60
United States									39.41	45.21		48.70	50.30	51.80	55.10	55.40	58.50	59.60	60.89	63.23	67.63
United Kingdom	33.94	31.27	39.09	40.58		40.95	41.97	40.60	43.99	44.12	45.41	45.62	49.92	53.56	51.21	57.26	58.43	60.78	61.96	60.88	68.11
Venezuela												28.00		29.00		31.00				38.00	
