= Health in the Netherlands =

Health in the Netherlands includes the leading causes of death, risk factors, mental health status, and health disparities of the population, as well as the impacts of climate change on health. A majority of deaths in the Netherlands were caused by cancer, with the incidence rate being greater than the EU average. Notable risk factors include smoking, obesity, alcohol consumption, and pollution. Overall, the mental health of adults has remained stable in the past few years, while adolescents and young adults have experienced a decline in their mental health. There has been a noticeable difference in the mental health and health status of individuals from a higher income group and education level compared to those with a lower income and education level. Climate change has also had negative health implications on the population, leading to greater heat wave mortality.

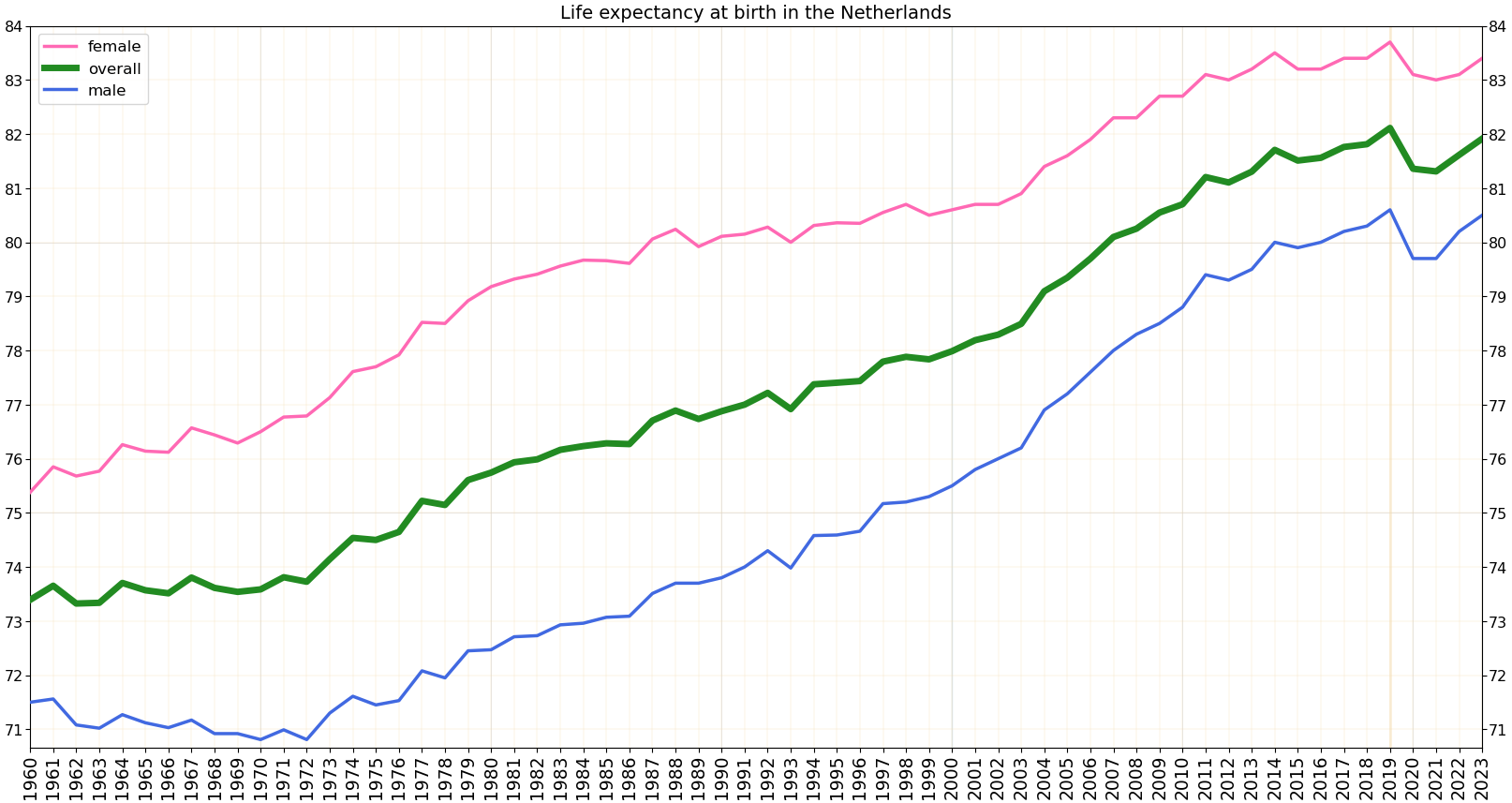
Life expectancy at birth in the Netherlands

== Health status ==
=== Life expectancy ===
A new measure of expected human capital calculated for 195 countries from 1990 to 2016 and defined for each birth cohort as the expected years lived from age 20 to 64 years and adjusted for educational attainment, learning or education quality, and functional health status was published by the Lancet in September 2018. The Netherlands had the fourth highest level of expected human capital with 27 health, education, and learning-adjusted expected years lived between age 20 and 64 years.

In 2025, the life expectancy in the Netherlands was 81.9 years. The life expectancy of individuals in the Netherlands dropped to 81.4 years during the COVID-19 pandemic and has not recovered.

=== Leading causes of death ===
Cancer (27.1%), cardiovascular disease (22.4%), and Alzheimer's disease and other dementias (9.9%) were the leading causes of death in 2023. There is an estimated 185,000 new cases of cardiovascular disease annually with an incidence rate that is 10% lower than the European Union (EU) average. While, there is approximately 116,000 new cases of cancer annually with the incidence rate of cancer being 11% greater than the EU average. Other notable causes of death include respiratory disease (8.8%), external causes (6.8%), and digestive diseases (3.2%).

=== Risk factors ===
In 2021, there were a total of 40,000 deaths caused by behavioral risk factors. With a total of about 21,000 death, smoking was considered the greatest behavioral risk factor. Tobacco measures are continuing to be implemented in the Netherlands, as a result of the goals included in the National Prevention Agreement, leading to a decline in the smoking rate for adults and youth since 2010. At a rate of about 15%, the Netherlands has a lower population of individuals classified as obese compared to the OECD average. However, the prevalence of obesity has been on the rise for adolescents and adults over the past few years. In 2022, approximately 8.3 liters per capita of alcohol was consumed indicating a decrease in overall alcohol consumption in the past few years. There was a total of 5,600 deaths resulting from pollution in the Netherlands, with individuals being exposed to 8.9 micrograms of particulate matter (PM2.5) per cubic meter in the environment.

=== Mental health ===
According to data from June 2025, the mental health of adults has remained stable in terms of the percentage of individuals who feel lonely (42%) and feel stressed (25%). There was a 3% decline in the amount of individuals who felt happy a majority of the time. Adolescents also experienced a decline in mental health. Approximately 30% of individuals aged 12–16, experience mental health issues, which include attention issues, emotional problems, and issues with peers. It was determined that it is more common for girls to experience these mental health problems compared to boys. Additionally, a study from 2025, found that individuals between the ages of 12 and 25 years old, experienced an increase in suicidal thoughts from 8.6% to 18.8% during the COVID-19 lockdown.

Men and women between the ages of 45 and 64, with an education level of primary education or pre-vocational secondary education have a greater percentage of individuals experiencing anxiety and depression compared to those who have a higher education. Higher education includes a university degree, higher professional education, senior general secondary education, pre-university education, or intermediate vocational education.

== Health disparities ==
In the Netherlands, a high income and education is associated with a longer and healthier life. Individuals with a higher education level have an average life span that is six years longer than lower educated individuals. In the highest income group, 81% of individuals reported being in good health and were associated with an average of 20 more years in good health compared to those in the lower income group. Only 53% of individuals in the lowest income group reported being in good health.

== Climate change ==
Due to rising temperatures, there have been several negative impacts on the health of individuals in the Netherlands. The Netherlands has increased in temperature two times faster than the global average, with the average temperature increasing by more than 2 °C since 1901. There has been an increase in length and temperature during heat waves, leading to an increase in the mortality rate, with 2020 seeing a 9% higher heat wave mortality rate. This increase in temperature has directly impacted over 100,000 individuals due to the heat's negative affect on air quality, mental health, and allergies. Heat also leads to health issues such as heat stroke, renal dysfunction, and cardiovascular disease. Furthermore, individuals in a lower income group are more likely to live in poorly insulated buildings, increasing their vulnerability to the negative impacts of climate change. Climate change has also led to infectious diseases, such as Legionnaires' disease being more common as well, as a result of the Legionella bacteria being able to multiply in warm water.

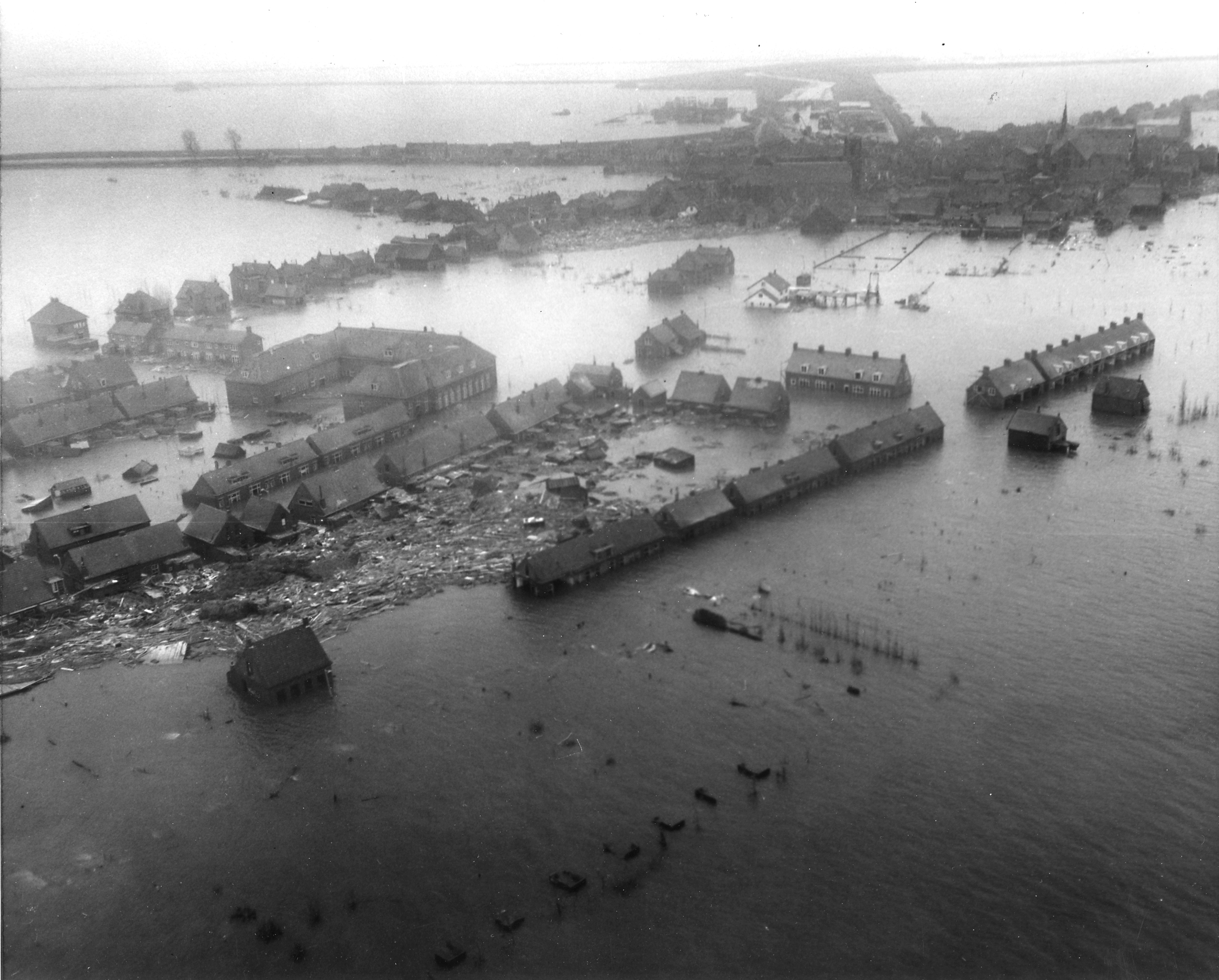
The North Sea Flood of 1953

Climate change has resulted in the death and displacement of thousands of individuals in the Netherlands. The most common extreme weather in the Netherlands includes flooding, severe rain, and wildfires. With one of the most prominent extreme weather cases in the Netherlands being the North Sea Flood of 1953, leading to over 340,000 acres being flooded, with approximately 1,836 lives lost and 100,000 individuals having to be evacuated.

== See also ==
- Healthcare in the Netherlands
