= Health in Denmark =

Overall health of the population of Denmark

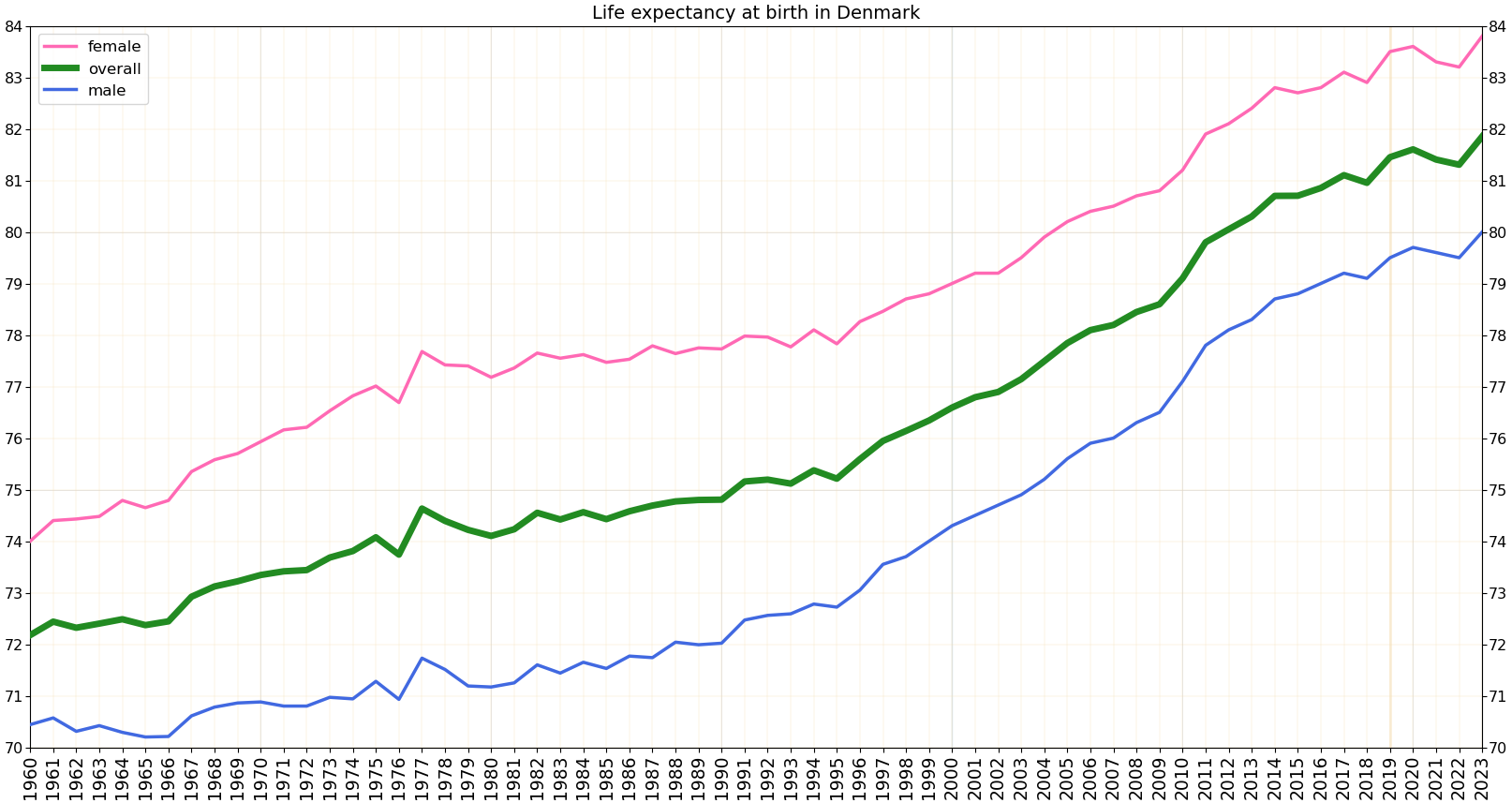
Life expectancy at birth in Denmark

As of 2012, Denmark had a life expectancy of 79.5 years at birth (77 for men, 82 for women), up from 75 years in 1990. This ranks it 37th among 193 nations, behind the other Nordic countries. The National Institute of Public Health of the University of Southern Denmark has calculated 19 major risk factors among Danes that contribute to a lowering of the life expectancy; this includes smoking, alcohol, drug abuse and physical inactivity. The large number of Danes becoming overweight is an increasing problem and results in an annual additional consumption in the health care system of DKK 1,625 million. In a 2012 study, Denmark had the highest cancer rate of all countries listed by the World Cancer Research Fund International; researchers suggest the reasons are better reporting, but also lifestyle factors like heavy alcohol consumption, smoking and physical inactivity. Denmark had the second highest death rate from alcohol of any region in Europe in 2015 at 6.9 per 100,000 population.

A new measure of expected human capital calculated for 195 countries from 1990 to 2016 and defined for each birth cohort as the expected years lived from age 20 to 64 years and adjusted for educational attainment, learning or education quality, and functional health status was published by the Lancet in September 2018. Denmark had the third highest level of expected human capital with 27 health, education, and learning-adjusted expected years lived between age 20 and 64 years.
