= Health in Belgium =

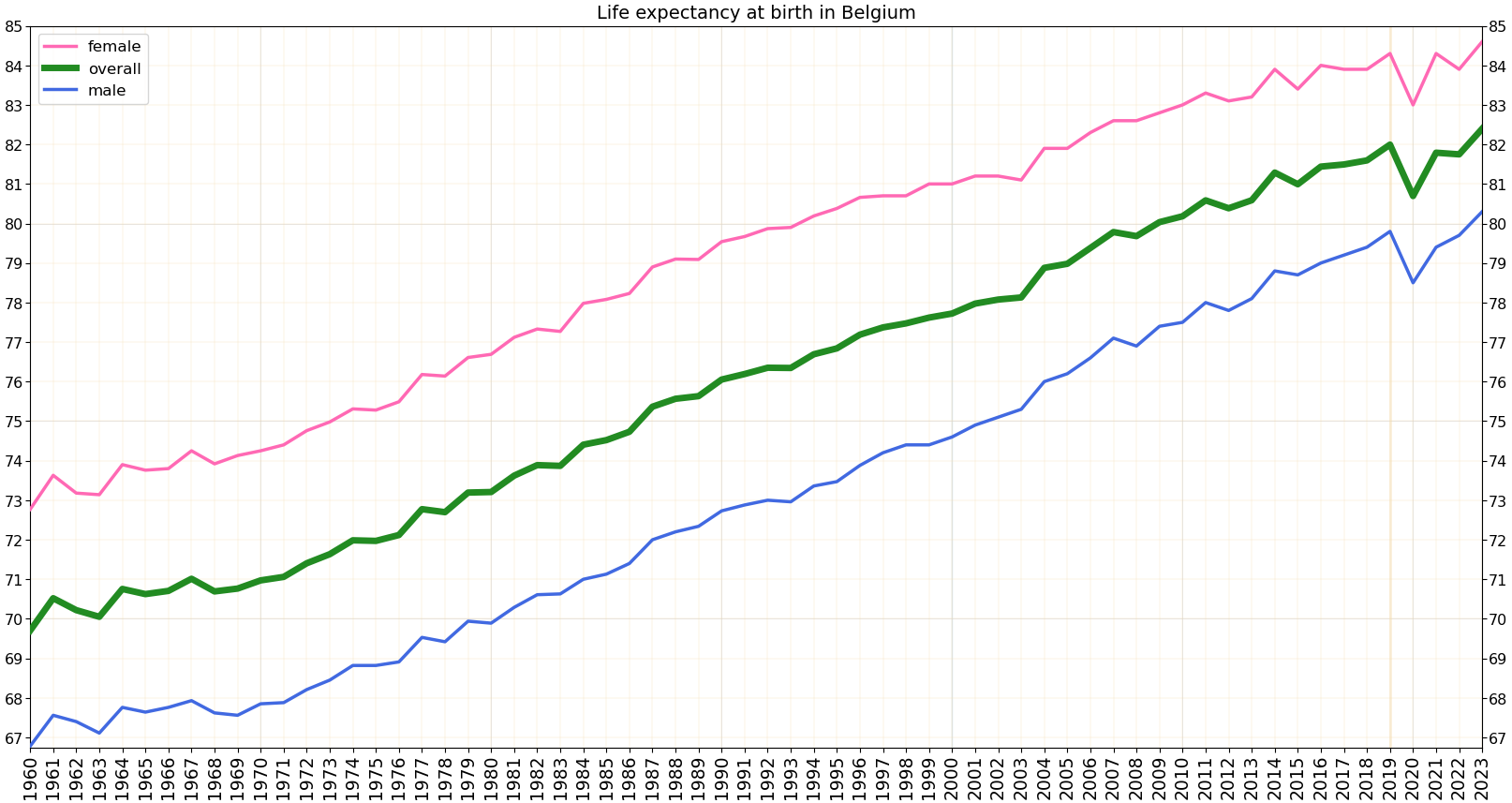
Life expectancy at birth in Belgium

A new measure of expected human capital calculated for 195 countries from 1990 to 2016 and defined for each birth cohort as the expected years lived from age 20 to 64 years and adjusted for educational attainment, learning or education quality, and functional health status was published by the Lancet in September 2018. Belgium had the tenth highest level of expected human capital with 25 health, education, and learning-adjusted expected years lived between age 20 and 64 years.

== See also ==
- Healthcare in Belgium
