= Health in Spain =

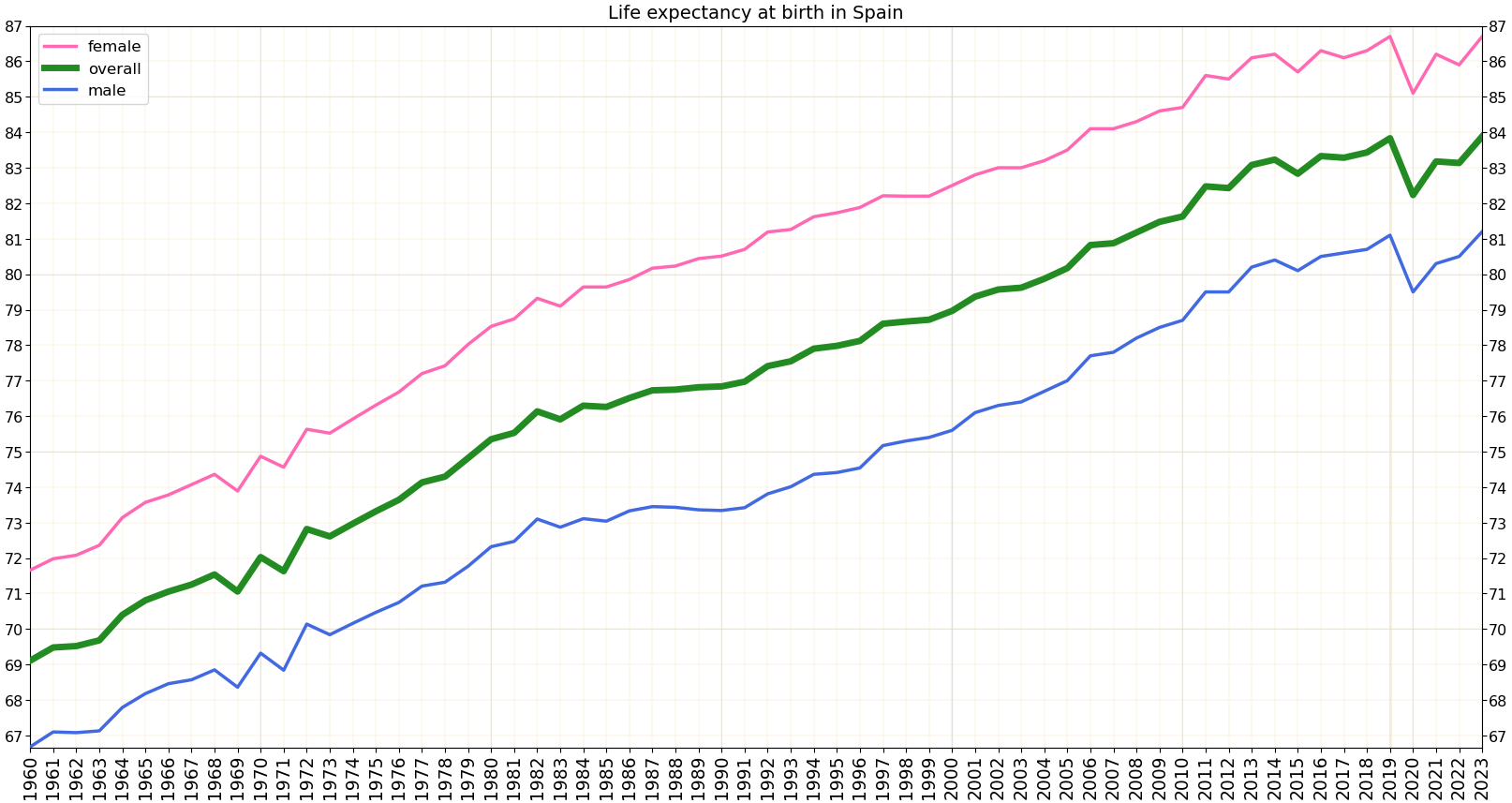
Life expectancy at birth in Spain

In 2012, life expectancy at birth in Spain reached 82.5 years, one of the highest among OECD countries and more than two years higher than the OECD average (80.2 years). Only Japan (83.2 years), Iceland (83.0 years) and Switzerland (82.8 years) had a higher life expectancy than Spain in 2012. The top three causes of death since 1970 have been cardiovascular diseases, cancer and respiratory diseases.

== Health status ==
=== Obesity ===
Share of adults that are obese, 1975 to 2016

In 2013 there had been a 14% rise in the number of overweight people since 1987 when the figure had been 40% according to a survey conducted by the Instituto Nacional de Estadistica. 18% of men and 16% of women were regarded as obese. These was attributed to an increase in sedentary lifestyles. 14.4% of men and 17% of women declared they don't do any physical exercise. In 2015 according to the World Health Organization 22.8% of men and 24.7% of women were obese. Spain was number 48 on the global obesity scale.

=== Smoking ===
Spain has achieved progress in reducing tobacco consumption over the past decade, with rates of daily smokers among adults coming down 32% in 2001 to 24% in 2011. However, smoking rates in Spain still remain higher than the developed world average.

=== Diabetes ===
In 2015 it was estimated that 10.58% of the population has diabetes, costing about $3,090 per person per year.

== Vaccination ==
Spain's 19 autonomous communities, consisting of 17 Regions and 2 cities, follow health policies established by the Inter-Territorial Health Council that was formed by the National and Regional Ministries of Health. This Inter-Territorial Council is composed of representatives from each region and meets to discuss health related issues spanning across Spain. The Institute of Health Carlos III (ISCIIII) is a public research institute that manages biomedical research for the advancement of health sciences and disease preventions. The ISCIII may suggest the introduction of new vaccines into Spain's Recommended Health Schedule and is under direct control of the Ministry of Health. Although the Ministry of Health is responsible for the oversight of health care services, the policy of devolution divides responsibilities among local agencies, including health planning and programing, fiscal duties, and direct management of health services. This decentralization proposes difficulties in collecting information at the national level. The Inter-Territorial Council's Commission on Public Health works to establish health care policies according to recommendations by technical working groups via letters, meetings, and conferences. The Technical Working Group on Vaccines review data on vaccine preventable diseases and proposes recommendations for policies. No additional groups outside the government propose recommendations. Recommendations must be approved by the Commission of Public Health and then by the Inter-Territorial Council, at which point they are incorporated into the National Immunization Schedule.

The Spanish Association of Pediatrics, in conjunction with the Spanish Medicines Agency, outlines specifications for vaccination schedules and policies and provides a history of vaccination policies implemented in the past, as well as legislature pertaining to the public currently. Spain's Constitution does not mandate vaccination, so it is voluntary unless authorities require compulsory vaccination in the case of epidemics. In 1921 vaccination became mandatory for smallpox, and in 1944 the Bases Health Act mandated compulsory vaccination for diphtheria and smallpox, but was suspended in 1979 after the elimination of the threat of an epidemic. The first systematic immunization schedule for the provinces of Spain was established in 1975 and has continuously been updated by each autonomous community in regard to doses at certain ages and recommendation of additional vaccine not proposed in the schedule. The 2015 schedule proposed the newest change with the inclusion of pneumococcal vaccine for children under 12 months. For 2016, the schedule plans to propose a vaccine against varicella in children at 12–15 months and 3–4 years. Furthermore, the General Health Law of 1986 echoes Article 40.2 from the Constitution guaranteeing the right to the protection of health, and states employers must provide vaccines to workers if they are at risk of exposure. Due to vaccination coverage in each Community, there is little anti-vaccine activity or opposition to the current schedule, and no organized groups against vaccines. The universal public health care provides coverage for all residents, while central and regional support programs extend coverage to immigrant populations. However, no national funds are granted to the Communities for vaccine purchases. Vaccines are financed from taxes, and paid in full by the Community government. Law 21 in Article 2.6 establishes the need for proper clinical documentation and informed consent by the patient, although written informed consent is not mandated in the verbal request of a vaccine for a minor. The autonomous regions collect data, from either electronic registries or written physician charts, to calculate immunization coverage.

== Climate change ==
Between 1998 and 2012 over three thousand people died annually due to heatwaves. In the (now unlikely) worst-case scenario that number could become 14,500 in 2035-2064 and over 30,000 between 2070 and 2099.

Rising temperatures, ozone levels, and particulate matter concentrations, particularly in urban areas, have been found to increase heat stress, leading to higher risk of death from various health conditions including ischaemic heart disease, stroke, metabolic disorders, and kidney disease. The health impacts of climate change may disproportionately affect groups such as people with chronic illnesses, the elderly, children, and people who are pregnant.

== See also ==
- Health care in Spain
- Water supply and sanitation in Spain
