= Health in Portugal =

Overview of health in Portugal

According to the World Bank income level classification, Portugal is considered to be a high income country. Its population was of 10,283,822 people, by 1 July 2019. WHO estimates that 21.7% of the population is 65 or more years of age (2018), a proportion that is higher than the estimates for the WHO European Region (15.1% by the same year).

== Changes in health and demographic consequences ==
During the last 50 years, the health of the Portuguese population has improved dramatically, accompanying a similar global trend. Current social and health-related challenges in the country are deeply influenced by low fertility and population aging.

=== Child mortality ===
In 1950, 14.03% of all the children born in Portugal died before reaching 5 years of age. At the same time, child mortality rate in Europe was 10.92%, while in the world it was on average 22.54%. In 2015, only 0.28% of all the children born in Portugal died before the age of 5 (0.58% in Europe and 4.5% in the world).

Similarly, infant mortality rate in the country has decreased from 8.44% of all newborns dying in the first year of their life in 1960, to 0.31% in 2017. This improvement was mainly due to the decrease in neonatal mortality, from 29.4 neonates (per 1000 live births) dying in their first 28 days of live in 1960 to 2 in 2019.

=== Fertility rate ===
As in other high-income countries of the Euro region, the fertility rate in Portugal has decreased around 40% since 1950 (when it was of 3.1), to on average 1.25 births per woman in 2015.

=== Life expectancy at birth ===
Life expectancy in Portugal

According to the latest WHO Report on Core Health Indicators for the Euro region, life expectancy at birth in Portugal was 81.6 years, in 2018. By the same year, the highest life expectancy reported in the European Region was 83 years. Also in 2018, observed female life expectancy at birth in Portugal was 84.7 years, while male life expectancy was 78.4 years, showing that, as in other countries of the Euro region, women in Portugal tend to live on average 6 years longer than men.

== Global Burden of Disease (GBD) in Portugal ==
By 2017, the GBD in Portugal was mainly attributed to Non-Communicable Diseases (NCD), being these responsible for 88.56% of total deaths in the country and 86.55% of total DALYS (disability-adjusted life years). Communicable, maternal, neonatal and nutritional diseases, also called Group I diseases, were responsible for 7.47% of deaths and 6.24% of DALYS. Injuries accounted for 3.96% of total deaths and 7.21% of total DALYS.

Comparing to data from 1990, the contribution of NCD to both deaths (87.6%) and DALYS (79.7%) has increased. The same has happened to Group I diseases in terms of number of deaths (4.76% of total deaths in 1990), but a decrease in the number of DALYS has been observed since 1990 (7.05% of total DALYS). Meanwhile, the contribution of injuries to the GBD in the country, measured in number of deaths and DALYS, has decreased (7.64% and 13.25%, respectively, in 1990).

Table 1: Causes of death in Portugal (both sexes, all ages) in 1990 and 2017
1990	2017
Cardiovascular diseases	Cardiovascular diseases
Neoplasms	Neoplasms
Digestive disorders	Neurological disorders
Neurological disorders	Respiratory infections and tuberculosis
Chronic respiratory	Diabetes and chronic kidney disease
Diabetes and chronic kidney disease	Chronic respiratory
Transport injuries	Digestive diseases
Respiratory infections and tuberculosis	Other non-communicable
Unintentional injuries	Unintentional injuries
Self-harm and violence	Self-harm and violence

As shown in Table 1, in 2017, 7 out of 10 most common causes of death in Portugal were non-communicable. Of these 7 causes of death, cardiovascular diseases were responsible for 345.86 deaths per 100 000, being ischemic heart disease and stroke the cardiovascular diseases costing more lives in the country.

Table 2: Causes of disability in Portugal (both sexes, all ages) in 1990 and 2017
1990	2017
Cardiovascular diseases	Neoplasms
Neoplasms	Cardiovascular diseases
Musculoskeletal disorders	Musculoskeletal disorders
Mental disorders	Neurological disorders
Transport injuries	Diabetes and chronic kidney disease
Neurological disorders	Mental disorders
Unintentional injuries	Chronic respiratory
Diabetes and chronic kidney disease	Unintentional injuries
Digestive diseases	Other non-communicable
Chronic respiratory	Digestive diseases

Cardiovascular diseases also represent a major cause of disability in the country, has shown in Table 2. In fact, many causes of death in the country are also responsible for a significant degree of disability. However, when it comes to the last one, musculoskeletal and mental disorders are also important to consider.

== The National Health Plan 2020 ==
The Portuguese National Health Plan is an important element for the implementation of health policies in the country since it defines the strategic plan for intervention in the public health system.

The National Health Plan 2020 defines the following health goals to be achieved by 2020:

- reduce the avoidable number of deaths within the population to below 20% (i.e. the mortality rate amongst people with 70 years or less)
- increase healthy life expectancy at 65 years of age by 30%
- reduce the prevalence of tobacco consumption within the population with 15 years of age or more
- control the incidence and prevalence of overweight and obesity in children

This plan was initially defined for the period between 2012 and 2016 but later extended to 2020. This extension results from recommendations emitted by the World Health Organization in its report “Health 2020: the European policy for health and well-being”.

== Health system ==
The status of health in Portugal results from the existence of a high-quality healthcare system (ranked as the 9th best in Europe and 12th in the World), the reason why the country has achieved good rankings in several health indices. The Portuguese healthcare system was ranked number 12 in overall performance by the World Health Organization in a 2000 report ranking the healthcare systems of each of the 190 United Nations member nations. Nonetheless, it ranked number 27 as the most expensive per capita healthcare system.

WHO estimates indicate that 11.9% of total government expenditure in Portugal is allocated to health (data from 2014), in comparison to 13.2% in the Euro region in the same year. Regarding the total health expenditure in the country, a share of 65% is financed by the public sector (2018). By the same year, the public financed share of total health expenditure in the Euro WHO region was 72.5%.

== Women's health ==
The maternal mortality rate in Portugal is 8.00 deaths/100,000 live births (as of 2010). This is low by global standards, but is still higher than many other Western countries. Portugal's HIV/AIDS rate is, at 0.6% of adults (aged 15–49), one of the highest in Europe. Since 2001, immigrants in Portugal are entitled to free health care, including free care during pregnancy and postnatal period, as well as use of family planning facilities.

== See also ==
- Healthcare in Portugal
