= Health in France =

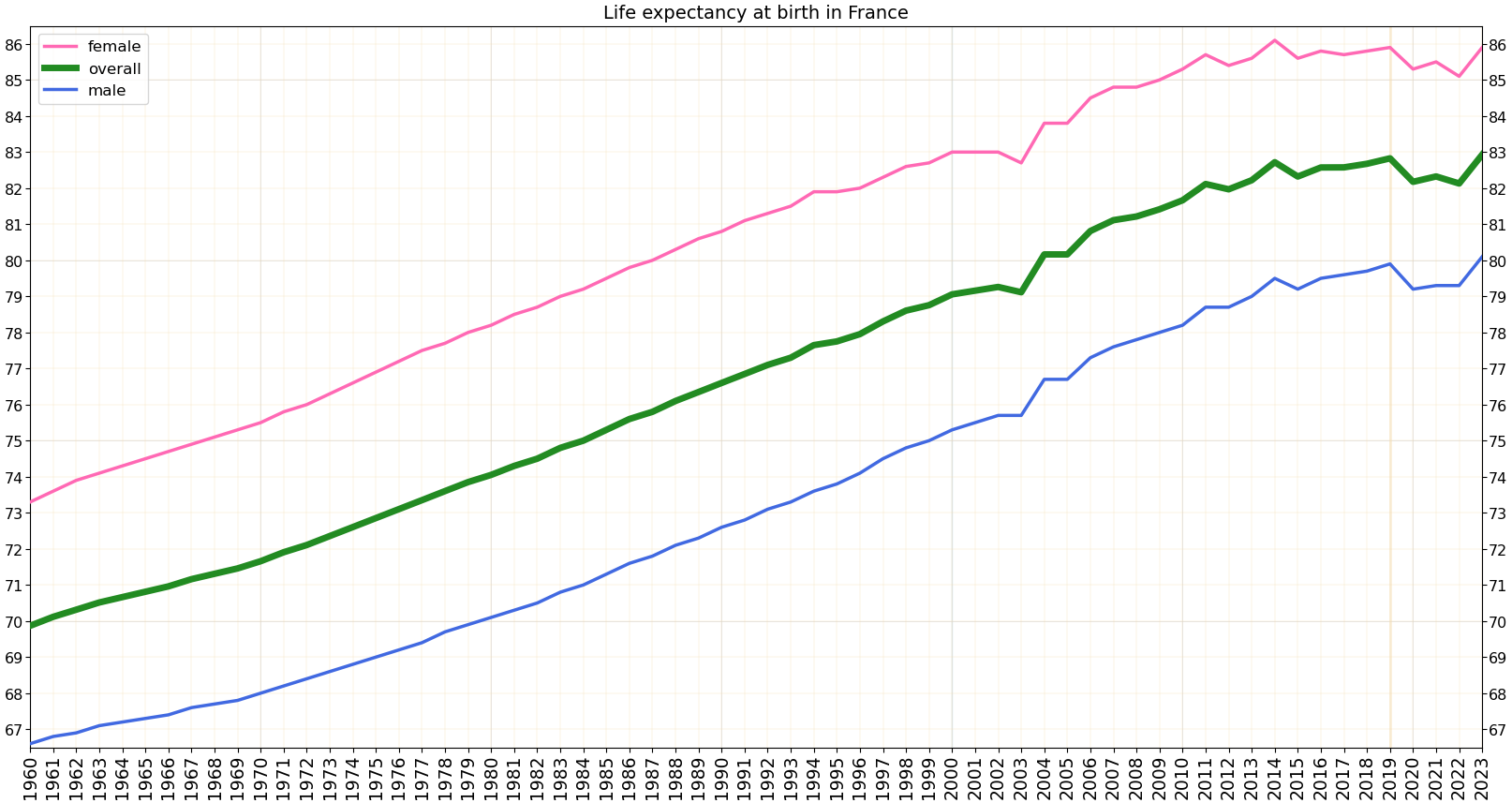
Life expectancy at birth in France

Life expectancy in France at birth was 81 years in 2008. A new measure of expected human capital calculated for 195 countries from 1990 to 2016 and defined for each birth cohort as the expected years lived from age 20 to 64 years and adjusted for educational attainment, learning or education quality, and functional health status was published by the Lancet in September 2018. France had the ninth highest level of expected human capital with 25 health, education, and learning-adjusted expected years lived between age 20 and 64 years.

== Healthcare issues in France ==
=== Obesity in France ===
Even though French are among the thinner Europeans (see chart below), obesity in France has been increasingly cited as a major health issue in recent years. It is now considered a political issue whereas just a few years prior it would only have been an issue reported on television talk shows or in women's magazines. However, France is only placed as the 128th fattest country in the World, one of the lowest ranked among developed countries. French food has long been studied for its health benefits.

Country	Average weight	BMI	Daily Calorie Intake	Source
United Kingdom	80 kg	29	2,200	
Italy	74 kg	26	2,100	
Germany	73.5 kg	26	2,400	
France	68 kg	24	2,200	

== Public health ==
The French Third Republic followed well behind Bismarckian Germany, as well as Great Britain, in developing the welfare state including public health. Tuberculosis was the most dreaded disease of the day, especially striking young people in their 20s. Germany set up vigorous measures of public hygiene and public sanatoria, but France let private physicians handle the problem, which left it with a much higher death rate. The French medical profession jealously guarded its prerogatives, and public health activists were not as well organized or as influential as in Germany, Britain or the United States. For example, there was a long battle over a public health law which began in the 1880s as a campaign to reorganize the nation's health services, to require the registration of infectious diseases, to mandate quarantines, and to improve the deficient health and housing legislation of 1850. However the reformers met opposition from bureaucrats, politicians, and physicians. Because it was so threatening to so many interests, the proposal was debated and postponed for 20 years before becoming law in 1902. Success finally came when the government realized that contagious diseases had a national security impact in weakening military recruits, and keeping the population growth rate well below Germany's.

=== Water supply and sanitation ===
France, as all EU countries, is under an EU directive to reduce sewage discharge to sensitive areas. In 2006, France was only 40% in compliance, one of the lowest achieving countries in the EU with regard to this waste-water treatment standard

== Vaccination ==
In France, the High Council of Public Health is in charge of proposing vaccine recommendations to the Minister of Health. Each year, immunization recommendations for both the general population and specific groups are published by the Institute of Epidemiology and Surveillance. Since some hospitals are granted additional freedoms, there two key people responsible for vaccine policy within hospitals: the Operational physician (OP), and the Head of the hospital infection and prevention committee.

Mandatory immunization policies on BCG, diphtheria, tetanus, and poliomyelitis began in the 1950s and policies on Hepatitis B began in 1991. Recommended but not mandatory suggestions on influenza, pertussis, varicella, and measles began in 2000, 2004, 2004, and 2005, respectively. According to the 2013 INPES Peretti-Watel health barometer, between 2005 and 2010, the percentage of French people between 18 and 75 years old in favor of vaccination dropped from 90% to 60%.

Since 2009, France has recommended meningococcus C vaccination for infants 1–2 years old, with a catch up dosage up to 25 years later. French insurance companies have reimbursed this vaccine since January 2010, at which point coverage levels were 32.3% for children 1–2 years and 21.3% for teenagers 14–16 years old. In 2012, the French government and the Institut de veille sanitaire launched a 5-year national program in order to improve vaccination policy. The program simplified guidelines, facilitated access to vaccination, and invested in vaccine research. In 2014, fueled by rare health-related scandals, mistrust of vaccines became a common topic in the French public debate on health. According to a French radio station, as of 2014, 3 to 5 percent of kids in France were not given the mandatory vaccines. Some families may avoid requirements by finding a doctor willing to forge a vaccination certificate, a solution which numerous French forums confirm. However, the French State considers "vaccine refusal" a form of child abuse. In some instances, parental vaccine refusals may result in criminal trials. France's 2010 creation of the Question Prioritaire Constitutionelle (QPC) allows lower courts to refer constitutional questions to the highest court in the relevant hierarchy. Therefore, criminal trials based on vaccine refusals may be referred to the Cour de Cassation, which will then certify whether the case meets certain criteria. In May 2015, France updated its vaccination policies on diphtheria, tetanus, acellular pertussis, polio, Haemophilus influenzae b infections, and hepatitis B for premature infants. As of 2015, while failure to vaccinate is not necessarily illegal, a parent's right to refuse to vaccinate his or her child is technically a constitutional matter. Additionally, children in France cannot enter schools without proof of vaccination against diphtheria, tetanus, and polio. French Health Minister, Marisol Touraine, finds vaccinations "absolutely fundamental to avoid disease," and has pushed to have both trained pharmacists and doctors administer vaccinations. Most recently, the Prime Minister's 2015–2017 roadmap for the "multi-annual social inclusion and anti-poverty plan" includes free vaccinations in certain public facilities. Vaccinations within the immunization schedule are given for free at immunization services within the public sector. When given in private medical practices, vaccinations are 65% reimbursed.

== See also ==
- Health care in France
