= Health in Cuba =

Health in Cuba refers to the overall health of the population of Cuba. Like the rest of the Cuban economy, Cuban medical care suffered following the end of Soviet subsidies in 1991. The Cuban government claims that the stepping up of the US embargo against Cuba has also impacted quality of care and the amount of resources available to the public. However, the Embargo or Trade Sanctions Reform and Export Enhancement Act of 2000 allows the sell of food, medications, and related equipment to Cuba. The mismanagement of healthcare infrastructure, decline in quality of care, and food shortages on the island appear to be caused by failed governmental strategies rather than outside pressure.

== History ==
Life expectancy development in Cuba

In the 1950s, the island had some of the most positive health indices in the Americas, not far behind the United States and Canada. Cuba was one of the leaders in life expectancy, and the number of doctors per thousand of the population ranked above Britain, France and the Netherlands. In Latin America it ranked in third place after Uruguay and Argentina. There remained marked inequalities however. Most of Cuba's doctors were based in the relatively prosperous cities and regional towns, and conditions in rural areas, notably Oriente, were significantly worse. The mortality rate was the third lowest in the world. According to the World Health Organization, the island had the lowest infant mortality rate of Latin America.

Following the Revolution, Cuba saw an increase in disease and infant mortality worsened in the 1960s. The new government asserted that universal healthcare was to become a priority of state planning. In 1960 guerrilla leader and physician Che Guevara outlined his aims for the future of Cuban healthcare in an essay entitled On Revolutionary Medicine, stating: "The work that today is entrusted to the Ministry of Health and similar organizations is to provide public health services for the greatest possible number of persons, institute a program of preventive medicine, and orient the public to the performance of hygienic practices."

=== Post-Soviet Union ===
The loss of Soviet subsidies brought food shortages to Cuba in the early 1990s.

A Canadian Medical Association Journal paper states that "The famine in Cuba during the Special Period was caused by political and economic factors similar to the ones that caused a famine in North Korea in the mid-1990s. Both countries were run by authoritarian regimes that denied ordinary people the food to which they were entitled when the public food distribution collapsed; priority was given to the elite classes and the military." The regime did not accept donations of food, medicines and money from the US until 1993. Malnutrition created epidemics.

== Present ==
WHO health statistics for Cuba Source: WHO country page on Cuba
| Life expectancy at birth m/f: | 77/81 (years, 2016) |
| Healthy life expectancy at birth m/f: | 67.1/69.5 (years) |
| Child mortality m/f: | 5 (per 1000 live births, 2018) |
| Adult mortality m/f: | 116/68 (per 1000 population, 2016) |
| Total health expenditure per capita: | 2475 (Intl $, 2014) |
| Total health expenditure as % of GDP: | 11.1 (2014) |

| Health Metrics | Statistic | Date of Information |
|---|---|---|
| HIV/AIDS adult incidence rate | 0.18 | 2023 |
| Fertility rate | 1.4 (children/woman) | 2020 |
| Birth rate | 9.18 births/1,000 population) | 2025 |
| Infant mortality rate | 6.2 (deaths/1,000 live births) | 2022 |
| Death rate | 9.85 (deaths/1,000 population) | 2022 |
| Life expectancy at birth | 73.7 (years) | 2023 |
| Suicide rate | 14.45 per 100,000 people per year | 2019 |

All statistics from the World Factbook except * taken from World Health Organization figures.

== Comparison of pre- and post-revolutionary indices ==
Life expectancy at birth in Cuba in 1955 was 63 years in 1960 it was 63.9 years. To put these values in context, life expectancy at birth in some other regions and countries in 1960 were: (World Bank data):
World, 50.18 years; Latin America and Caribbean, 56.21 years; high-income OECD countries, 69.01 years; United States, 69.77 years.

In 2007, the life expectancies at birth were as follows (World Bank data): Cuba, 78.26 years;
World, 68.76 years; Latin America and Caribbean, 73.13 years; high income OECD countries, 79.66 years; United States, 77.99 years.

The mortality rate for children under five years old was 54 per 1000 in Cuba in 1960 (World Bank). That year in Latin America and the Caribbean it was 154.66 per 1000; in the high-income OECD countries it was 43.11; in the United States, 30.2. No World datum is available for 1960, but for 1970 it was 145.67 per 1000 (World Bank data).

The mortality rates for children under five in 2007 were as follows (World Bank): Cuba, 6.5; World, 68.01; Latin America and Caribbean, 26.37; high-income OECD, 5.71; United States, 7.60.

Infant mortality was 32 per 1000 live births in Cuba in 1957. In 2000–2005 it was 6.1 per 1000 in Cuba; and, for comparison, 6.8 per 1000 in the United States. The 2007 infant mortality rates published by the World Health Organization in 2009 were: Cuba, 5; World, 46;
High income countries, 6; United States, 6.

The table below shows CEPAL (United nations) data spanning the pre- and post-revolutionary periods for three public health indicators. Health levels were better than the Latin American average before the revolution and showed continued steady improvement throughout the post-revolutionary period. The total mortality rate shown is the crude – i.e., not age-adjusted – rate, and therefore tends to rise as the proportion of elderly people in the population increases, which has been the case in Cuba because the birth rate is falling and life expectancy is rising.

Cuba: Public health 1950–2005
| | 1950–55 | 1955–60 | 1960–65 | 1965–70 | 1970–75 | 1975–80 | 1980–85 | 1985–90 | 1990–95 | 1995–00 | 2000–05 |
| Life expectancy | 59.5 | 62.4 | 65.4 | 68.6 | 71.0 | 73.1 | 74.3 | 74.6 | 74.8 | 76.2 | 77.1 |
| Mortality rate | 10.73 | 9.21 | 8.56 | 7.30 | 6.37 | 5.94 | 6.31 | 6.65 | 7.06 | 6.66 | 7.08 |
| Under-5 mortality | 112.4 | 93.9 | 75.9 | 58.6 | 43.6 | 27.0 | 21.2 | 19.3 | 18.7 | 11.8 | 7.72 |
Notes: Life expectancy is life expectancy at birth. Mortality rate is the crude mortality rate; i.e., annual number of deaths per 1,000 inhabitants. The under-5 mortality is the number of deaths of children up to age five, per 1,000 live births. Source: United Nations, Comisión Económica para América Latina y el Caribe (Economic Commission for Latin America and the Caribbean—CEPAL), Cepal Stat, Social Indicators and Statistics.

=== Health indicators and issues ===
According to The World Factbook, by 2009 Cuba had an average life expectancy of 79.5 years.

Cuba began a food rationing program in 1962 to guarantee all citizens a low-priced basket of basic foods. As of 2007, the government was spending about $1 billion annually to subsidise the food ration. The ration would cost about $50 at an average grocery store in the United States, but the Cuban citizen pays only $1.20 for it. The ration includes rice, legumes, potatoes, bread, eggs, and a small amount of meat. It provides about 30 to 70 percent of the 3,300 kilocalories that the average Cuban consumes daily. The people obtain the rest of their food from government stores (Tiendas), free market stores and cooperatives, barter, their own gardens, and the black market.

According to the Pan American Health Organization, daily caloric intake per person in various places in 2003 were as follows (unit is kilocalories):
Cuba, 3,286;
America, 3,205;
Latin America and the Caribbean, 2,875;
Latin Caribbean countries, 2,593;
United States, 3,754.

Distribution of years of life lost by cause (%)
| Place | Communicable | Non-communicable | Injuries |
|---|---|---|---|
| Cuba | 9 | 75 | 16 |
| World | 51 | 34 | 14 |
| High income countries | 8 | 77 | 15 |
| United States | 9 | 73 | 18 |
| Low income countries | 68 | 21 | 10 |
Source: World Health Organization. World Health Statistics 2009, Table 2, "Cause-specific mortality and morbidity".

According to the WHO, the most common cause of death in the year 2021 was COVID-19 followed by Ischemic heart disease and strokes.

Abortion rates, which are high in Cuba, increased dramatically during the 1980s, but had almost halved by 1999 and declined to near-1970s levels of 32.0 per 1000 pregnancies. The abortion rate in Cuba is of 72.8 abortions per 100 births, the highest in the world.

Among adults less than 49 years old, accidents are the leading cause of death, though occupational accidents have declined significantly in the last decade. The homicide rate is 7.0 per 100,000. The rate of suicide in the island is higher than average in Latin America and has been among the highest in the region and the world since the nineteenth century. Annual suicide deaths per 100,000 population (2003–2005 data) were: Cuba 13.6, Americas 7.7, Latin America and Caribbean 5.8, Latin Caribbean 8.7, United States 10.8.

While preventive medical care, diagnostic tests and medication for hospitalized patients are free, some aspects of healthcare are paid for by the patient. Items which are paid by patients who can afford it are: drugs prescribed on an outpatient basis, hearing, dental, and orthopedic processes, wheelchairs and crutches. When a patient can obtain these items at state stores, prices tend to be low as these items are subsidized by the state. According to the Cuban Observatory for Human Rights, in the year 2022, 72% of Cubans living on the island were identified as living below the poverty line.

=== Child healthcare ===
According to WHO figures for 2016, Cuba (U5M) has an under-5 child mortality U5M rate of 5.5 per 1000 live births.

== See also ==
- Healthcare in Cuba
