= Health in Norway =

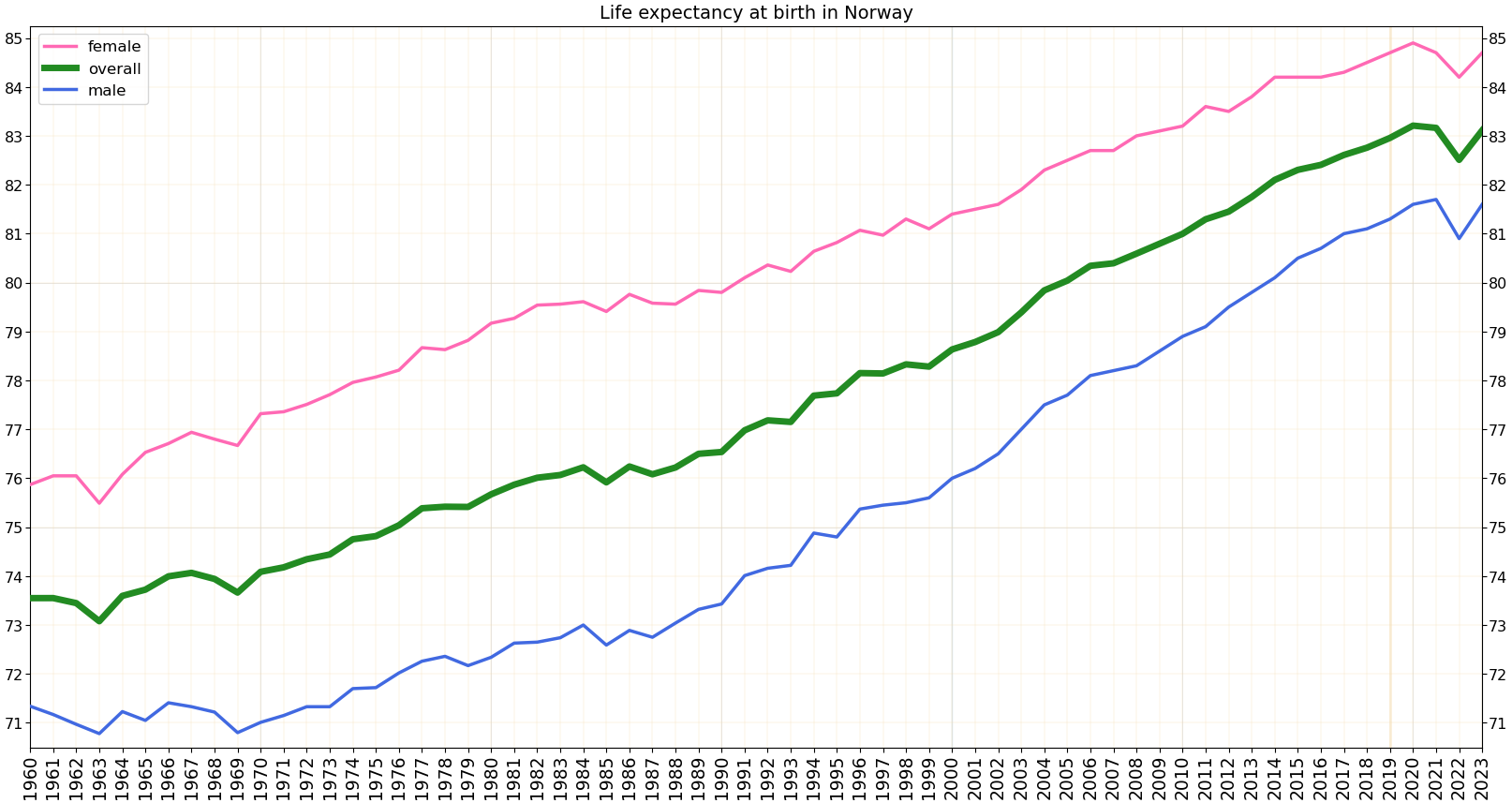
Life expectancy at birth in Norway

Health in Norway, with its early history of poverty and infectious diseases along with famines and epidemics, was poor for most of the population at least into the 1800s. The country eventually changed from a peasant society to an industrial one and established a public health system in 1860. Due to the high life expectancy at birth, the low Child mortality rate and the fertility rate in Norway, it is fair to say that the overall health status in the country is generally good.

== Population data ==
Norway has a birth-, death-, cancer-, and population register, which enables the authorities to have an overview of the health situation in Norway. The total population in Norway as of 2018, was 5,295,619. The life expectancy at birth was 81 years for males and 84 years for females (2016). The under five mortality per 1000 live births in 2016 were three cases and the probability of dying between 15 and 60 years for males was 66 and 42 for females per 1000 in population. The total expenditure on health per capita was $6,347 in 2014. Total expenditure on health as percentage of GDP was 9,7% Gross national income per capita was $81,807 (2018).

=== Fertility ===
The total fertility rate per women in 2018 was 1,62, while the regional average was 1,6 and global average was 2,44. Prevalence of tuberculosis was 10 per 100 000 in population and the regional average was 56 while global average was 169. In Norway today, there are 5371 HIV positive people, 3618 men and 1753 women. In 2008 the incidence of HIV positive people had a peak and the highest incidence of HIV positive. Since that, there have been a decrease in new cases.

=== Human Development Index ===
Norway was awarded first place according to the United Nations Human Development Index (HDI) for 2018 .

A new measure of expected human capital calculated for 195 countries from 1990 to 2016 and defined for each birth cohort as the expected years lived from age 20 to 64 years and adjusted for educational attainment, learning or education quality, and functional health status was published by the Lancet in September 2018. Norway had the seventh highest level of expected human capital with 25 health, education, and learning-adjusted expected years lived between age 20 and 64 years.

Demographic measures for Norway:

Total population (2018)	5,295,619
Gross national income per capita (PPP international $, 2018)	81,807
Life expectancy at birth m/f (years, 2017)	81/84
Probability of dying before the age of five (per 1 000 live births, 2017)	3
Probability of dying between 15 and 60 years m/f (per 1 000 population, 2016)	66/42
Total expenditure on health per capita (Intl $, 2014)	6,347
Total expenditure on health as % of GDP (2014)	9.7

== History ==
In the early Norway faced major challenges. The differences between rich and poor were large, living conditions poor and infant mortality high. Economic conditions in the country improved, but some social groups still lived under constrained conditions. The nutritional status was poor as well as hygiene and living conditions. The conditions and class differences were worse in the cities than in the countryside.

Immunization against smallpox was introduced in the first decade of the 19th century. In 1855, Gaustad Hospital opened as the first mental asylum in the country and was the start of an expansion in treating people with such disorders. After 1900 living standards and health conditions improved and the nutritional status improved as poverty decreased. Improvement in public health occurred during development in several areas such as social and living conditions, changes in disease and medical outbreaks, establishment of the health care system and emphasis on public health matters. Vaccination and increased treatment opportunities with antibiotics resulted in great improvements. Average income increased as did improvements in hygiene. Nutrition became better and more effective also improving general health.

In the 1900s the situation improved in Norway and, as a result of decreased poverty, nutritional status improved. Within 100 years Norway became a wealthy nation. Even though Norway experienced a setback during World War II, the country achieved steady development. Improved hygiene led to fewer infectious diseases and scientific discoveries led to breakthroughs in many fields including health.

However, an economic downturn in the 1920s exacerbated the nutritional situation within the country. Nutrition therefore became an important part of social policies. In periods there were high rates of unemployment, and poverty affected women and children most. Children often had to walk long distances to get work as shepherds during the summer in order to help their families with income. In mining towns as Røros, children also had to work in the mines. Living conditions improved during the 1900s. From being a poor country, Norway developed within 100 years to become a wealthy nation. Even though the country experienced a setback under the Second World War, the country achieved steady development. From 1975 Norway was self-sufficient in petroleum products and oil became an important part of the Norwegian economy. Improved hygiene led to fewer infectious diseases and scientific discoveries led to breakthroughs in many fields including health.

After 1945, smoking became a relevant factor. While infectious diseases decreased, chronic diseases such as cardiovascular disease were blooming. From 2000, life expectancy was still on the increase. There are, however, still social differences when it comes to health. While globalization increases the demand for infectious control and knowledge, the Norwegian population demands more from the government in regard to health and treatment.

=== Infant mortality ===
Early on, there were no statistics kept for the whole country on infant mortality, but in Asker and Bærum in 1809 infant mortality was 40 percent for all live births. In 1900, infant mortality was higher in Norway than in any other European country. Development of the welfare state has contributed to a great decrease in infant mortality rates. This can be attributed to better nutrition and living conditions, better education and economy, better treatment possibilities and preventive health care (especially immunization). The infant mortality rate increased again between the 1970 and 1980 due to sudden infant death syndrome (SIDS). SIDS was unknown from earlier, but the increase was dramatic. The trend was reversed when Norwegian parents were encouraged to lay their children on their backs and not their stomachs when sleeping.

=== Population ===
At the beginning of the 19th century the total population was just under 1 million, however it doubled within the next hundred years even though many decided to emigrate. Industrialization resulted in many people emigrating from the countryside to the major cities for work. At the beginning of the 1900s the population was 2.2 million and increased to about 4.5 million through the 1900s. 15 percent of the country's population lived in Oslo and Akershus. The proportion of people associated with agriculture, forestry and fishing declined while the percentage affiliated with industries increased.

=== Communicable diseases ===
The Norwegian government recognized that the population needed to improve its health if the country was to become a nation with strong economic development.

- Cholera and typhoid fever were common communicable diseases in the 1800s. Norway experienced several epidemics; cholera was the worst. The last epidemic outbreaks were around the 1840s. Even though these were not as severe as the Black Death in the 1300s, mortality rates were high.
- Sexually transmitted diseases also caused widespread problems. These were, however, not defined and divided into gonorrhea and syphilis until later.
- Smallpox was the most serious disease in the years around 1800; legislation for vaccination against smallpox was introduced in 1810. At first, the law was not strictly enforced but when people were commanded to show their vaccination cards at confirmations and weddings, there was an increase in the vaccinating of children and Norway finally gained some control over this disease.
- Leprosy, also known as Hansen's disease, ravaged the west coast of Norway. Patients were isolated in leprosy hospitals with room for up to 1000 patients. Gerhard Armauer Hansen (1841–1912), working in Bergen, discovered the leprosy bacillus. He revealed the association between hospitalization for infected patients and a decrease in the number of new cases.
- Tuberculosis caused many deaths in the late 1800s while leprosy rates declined. Mortality of tuberculosis was high around 1900, but decreased steadily for the next fifty years. The greatest decrease in tuberculosis happened before vaccinations and medical treatments were available; the decrease was caused by improved living conditions, nutrition, and hygiene.
- The Spanish flu of 1918 affected the country. This influenza pandemic took many lives, especially those of young people who lacked immunity to the new flu virus.
- Diphtheria, a common childhood disease, raged during the early years of World War II, but with new vaccines available, the country experienced an immediate positive response.
- Polio had its last major outbreak in 1951 when 2100 cases were registered. In 1956 immunization of polio started.

=== Discovery of microbes ===
In the late 1800s microbes were discovered and prevention of diseases were now possible. Until now, spreading of infections had only been debated. With new discoveries within the field and greater understanding on how bacteria and viruses transfer and spread among humans it was possible to make significant changes in treatment and care of patients. One example was to isolate people with leprosy and tuberculosis in order to stop spreading.

=== Antibiotics ===
In the 1900s many vaccines were developed and the first antibiotic, penicillin, came about in the 1940s. These introductions were very powerful tools in preventing and treatment of childhood diseases.

=== Vaccines ===
More vaccines became available and the child-vaccination-program was growing rapidly. Almost all feared childhood diseases were going extinct. Vaccines against measles (rubella) were introduced to the childhood immunization program in 1978. Rubella is dangerous to the fetus if the mother is affected during pregnancy. Today, all children are offered free vaccines and the offer is voluntary. The coverage for most vaccines is high.

=== HIV/AIDS ===
In the early 1980s AIDS came as an unknown disease. Norway was early in preventing it in high-risk groups, through information campaigns. The HIV virus was later discovered and HIV tests became available from 1985.

=== Cardiovascular diseases ===
Incidences of tuberculosis became fewer and an increase in cases and mortality of chronic diseases appeared, especially cardiovascular disease. Tobacco is one of the most important causes of cardiovascular and cancer diseases. During World War 2, the tobacco use in Norway was limited because of strict rationing. After the war, sale of tobacco bloomed and so did the implications from consuming it. In the late 1900s, chronic diseases were dominating and because of increased life expectancy, people lived longer with these chronic diseases. Around millennium new treatment and prevention for cardiovascular diseases ensured a decrease in mortality, however, these diseases are still one of the greatest public challenges in the country. The incidence of coronary heart disease in Norway reduced significantly between 1995 and 2010, with about 66% of the reduction due to changes in modifiable risk factors like activity levels, blood pressure, and cholesterol. Mortality reduced from 137 per 100,000 person-years to 65.

=== Lifestyle diseases ===
Lifestyle diseases are a new concept from the second half of the 1900s. Tobacco use and increases in cholesterol levels show a strong correlation to higher risk of cardiovascular disease.

=== Mental health ===
Mental health services are part of the Norwegian special health care services. In some cases this includes involuntary mental health treatment. The four regional health service institutions, owned by the state, receive fixed economic support from the state budget. They are responsible for special health services including mental health care in hospitals, institutions, district mental health centers, child and adolescent mental health services and nursing homes.

In addition to providing treatment, the mental health care services provide research, education for health personnel, and follow-up of patients and their relatives.

There are different sectors within the mental health services. District mental health centers are responsible for general mental health service. They have outpatient facilities, inpatient facilities and emergency teams. Patients can be referred to the district mental health center by a general practitioner for diagnosing, treatment or admission.

There are specialized centers, ideally at central hospitals, for children and adolescents, the elderly, and severe cases such as drug addiction, personality disorders, obsessive compulsive disorders etc. Normally people who are discharged from treatment at central hospitals are referred to the district mental health centers for follow-up and treatment. Treatment can consist of psychotherapy with or without medications. Physical treatments, such as electroconvulsive therapy, are used for specific disorders. Treatment usually starts at the hospital, with the aim of continuing treatment at home or at the district mental health center.

==== Children and adolescents ====
Child and adolescent mental health outpatient facilities offer mental health care for children and adolescents between 0–17 years of age. Central child and adolescent mental health service is aimed at challenges which cannot be handled in the regional state facilities, such as the general practitioner, school nurse, school, outreach services for youth and child services. The child and adolescent mental health services work closely with psychologists, child psychiatrists, family therapists, neurologists, social workers etc. Their aim is to diagnose and treat psychiatric disorders, behavioral disorders and learning disorders in close collaboration with care givers. For patients below the age of 16, parents must consent to admission.

==== Involuntary care ====
Involuntary mental health care in Norway is divided into inpatient and outpatient facilities and observation. In involuntary inpatient facilities patients can be held against their will, and can be picked up by the police if needed. In involuntary outpatient services the patient lives at home or is voluntarily in an institution, but regularly has to report to the district mental health center. These patients cannot be held against their will, but can be picked up by the police in the case of missed appointments. For involuntary observation in hospital a person can be held for up to ten days, or in some cases for twenty days, in order for the hospital to decide whether the criteria for involuntary mental health care are met. The control committee has as their main task to ensure that every patient's rights are secured and protected in a meeting with involuntary care.

==== Financing ====
Mental health services are financed through needs-based basic funding to the regional health services, outpatient clinic refunding, deductibles and ear-marked grants from the state budget. Rates for outpatient work are partly based on hours worked and partly based on procedures; there are rates for diagnosing, treatment and follow-up per telephone or in collaborative meetings. In addition patients pay a deductible for outpatient consultations.

==== Burden of disease ====
A survey done in 2011 showed that 10.2% of the population of Norway reported to have experienced symptoms of anxiety and depression within the last two weeks. The lifetime prevalence of severe depression is estimated to be 15.6%. Treatment and social services for the mentally ill cost society about 70 million Norwegian kroner (more than 10 million US dollars) yearly.

== Life expectancy and death ==
The report, 2016 shows that life expectancy has increased by five years, from 76.8 years in 1990 to 81.4 years in 2013. The reduction in deaths from cardiovascular disease is the main reason for this increase. Life expectancy in Norway in 2017, was 84.3 years in women and 80.9 years in men. From 2007 to 2017, life expectancy increased by 2.7 years for men, but only by 1.6 year for women. This can be explained, for example, by different "smoking careers" for men and women.

As an impact of COVID-19 the life expectancy for women fell from 84,9 years in 2020 to 84,7 years in 2021. The following year, the life expectancy for men fell from 81,6 years in 2021 to 80,9 years in 2022, in the same year the life expectancy for women fell to 84,4 years.

Public Health Report 05/2018, shows that the two main causes of death are cardiovascular disease and cancer. The mortality rate of cardiovascular disease has fallen significantly over the past 50 years, and deaths have been largely pushed to age groups over 80 years. In younger age groups, the number of deaths is low.

Annually, between 550 and 600 die of suicide, about half past 50 years of age. Compared to other countries, there are relatively many who die of drug-fatal deaths, an average of 260 per year.

Deaths due to traffic accidents have fallen considerably, the average number of death last 5 years is 138, serious injuries 678.

=== Unhealthy diet ===
One of the major findings from the report (2016), is that an unhealthy diet is the most important risk factor for premature deaths in Norway.

“46 per cent of all deaths before the age of 70 in Norway can be explained by behavioural factors such as unhealthy diet, obesity, low physical activity and the use of alcohol, tobacco and drugs” says Professor Stein Emil Vollset, Director of the newly established Centre for Burden of Disease at the Norwegian Institute of Public Health.

“If we consider the population as a whole, it appears that an unhealthy diet represents a greater risk to public health than smoking. This is not because an unhealthy diet is more dangerous than smoking but because fewer Norwegians now smoke. Since 1990, the percentage of smokers in Norway has decreased from 35 per cent to 13 per cent”, explains Vollset.

By addressing these risk factors, much of Norway's disease burden could be reduced. Up to 100,000 years of life could be saved if Norwegians ate healthier diets.

Approximately 1 in 4 middle-aged men and 1 in 5 women have obesity with a body mass index of 30 kg/m^{2} or higher in Norway. Among children, the proportion with overweight and obesity appears to have stabilised.

=== Drug overdose and suicide ===
Drug overdose and suicide rates are high. Among the under-49 age group, suicide and drug overdoses are the main causes of death in Norway, with the highest rates among the Nordic countries (Denmark, Iceland, Norway, Finland and Sweden).

The report shows that lower back pain, neck pain, anxiety and depression are among the main causes of poor health among the Norwegian population as a whole, while heart disease and cancer claim most lives.

=== Diseases of affluence ===
A wealthy economy makes it possible to buy tobacco, fast food, sweets and sugary drinks that few people had access to or could afford until after 1950. These days many people have desk jobs, cars, and less demanding housework. In large, physical activity is decreasing, electronics, computers, social media, and the internet demands more of daily life. Drugs have also become more available in society. ‘New living conditions’ such as these give rise to new challenges for public health. Only 30 percent of adults in Norway are fulfilling the advice to stay physically active for 150 minutes per week.

=== Tobacco ===
The number of people smoking in Norway has fallen equally for both men and women since 2000. 11% of the adult population in Norway smoke on a daily basis while 8% are occasional smokers. Daily smoking is most common for the population with low educational attainment. Over the last two decades, efforts to reduce the population's exposure to tobacco smoke combined with increased awareness of the health risks of smoking appear to be having an impact. For example, early death from tobacco smoke fell 28% between 1990 and 2013.

In Norway 2017, 11 per cent was daily smokers, in 2007, it was 22 per cent daily smokers.

The use of snus has during the same period become more common among the population. 12% of the population daily use snus and 4% are occasional snus users.

=== Non-communicable diseases ===
The main causes of reduced health and disability in Norway are cardiovascular diseases, cancer, mental health and musculoskeletal disorders.

Annually, 70,000 people are treated for cardiovascular diseases. Technological progress and development within medical treatment have since the 1970s had huge impact on survival of diseases, especially cardiovascular disease.

Anxiety and depression are the most prevalent of mental disease. 6% of the population under 75 years takes antidepressants.

Other non-communicable diseases such as COPD, diabetes and dementia also weigh heavily on the burden of disease. As the life expectancy is increasing, more people are living longer with chronic diseases. Prescription drug consumption is high.

=== Social differences in health ===
The living standard of the Norwegian population has increased, though there are still differences between educational groups. Those with higher education and economy have generally the best health status and live 5–6 years longer than those with lower educational attainment. New public health legislation (Folkehelseloven) came into play in 2012, and the purpose of this act is to contribute to a society that promotes public health and evens out social inequalities in health.

== Child mortality ==
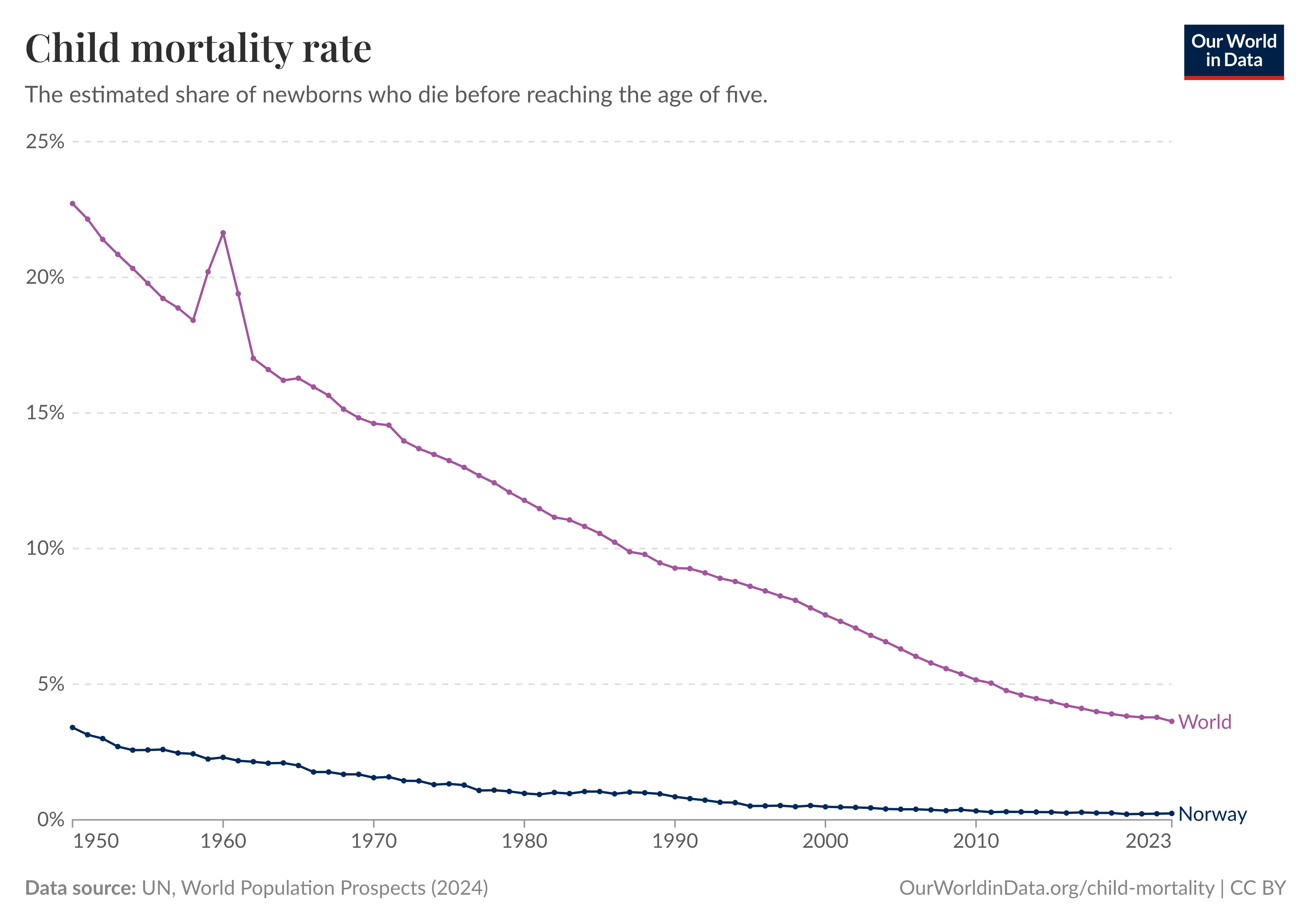
Child mortality rates in Norway and globally from 1950 to 2023

Child mortality is a key indicator of population health. It measures the probability that a newborn will die before reaching the age of five, expressed as deaths per 1,000 live births. In Norway, the child mortality rate has declined steadily from 1950 to 2023, and the country is among those that have met Sustainable Development Target 3.2, which aims to end preventable deaths of newborns and children under five years of age. Norway's under-five mortality rate in 2023 is exceptionally low at 0.2%, compared with the global average of 3.6%.

Child mortality rates in Norway vs Globally (1950–2023)
Year	Norway (per 1,000 live births)	Global average (per 1,000 live births)
1950	34	247
1970	16	146
1990	9	93
2010	3	52
2023	2	36

The under-five mortality rate has shown a decreasing trend globally over the past decades. The probability of a child dying before age five decreased from 24.7% in 1950 to 3.6% in 2023. Despite this improvement, there is still progress to be made in reducing child mortality worldwide. Our World in Data identifies several factors contributing to the decline, including improved access to healthcare, widespread immunisation, availability of medicines, better nutrition, and reductions in poverty and conflict. The reduction from 3.4% in 1950 to 0.2% in 2023 in Norway illustrates the significant impact of these factors on child survival.

As a high-income country with a well-developed health system, Norway's public health policies have had a positive impact in achieving low child mortality. Norway has implemented a free and legally required healthcare programme for all children from birth to five years of age. This comprehensive programme includes 14 scheduled check-ups, home visits by public health nurses, vaccinations, and guidance on nutrition, development, and safety. Universal access to preventive care and early intervention is associated with better health outcomes, and the public health programme is considered an important part of Norway's efforts to reduce child mortality.

== Disease Burden ==
=== DALYs in Norway 1990–2019 ===
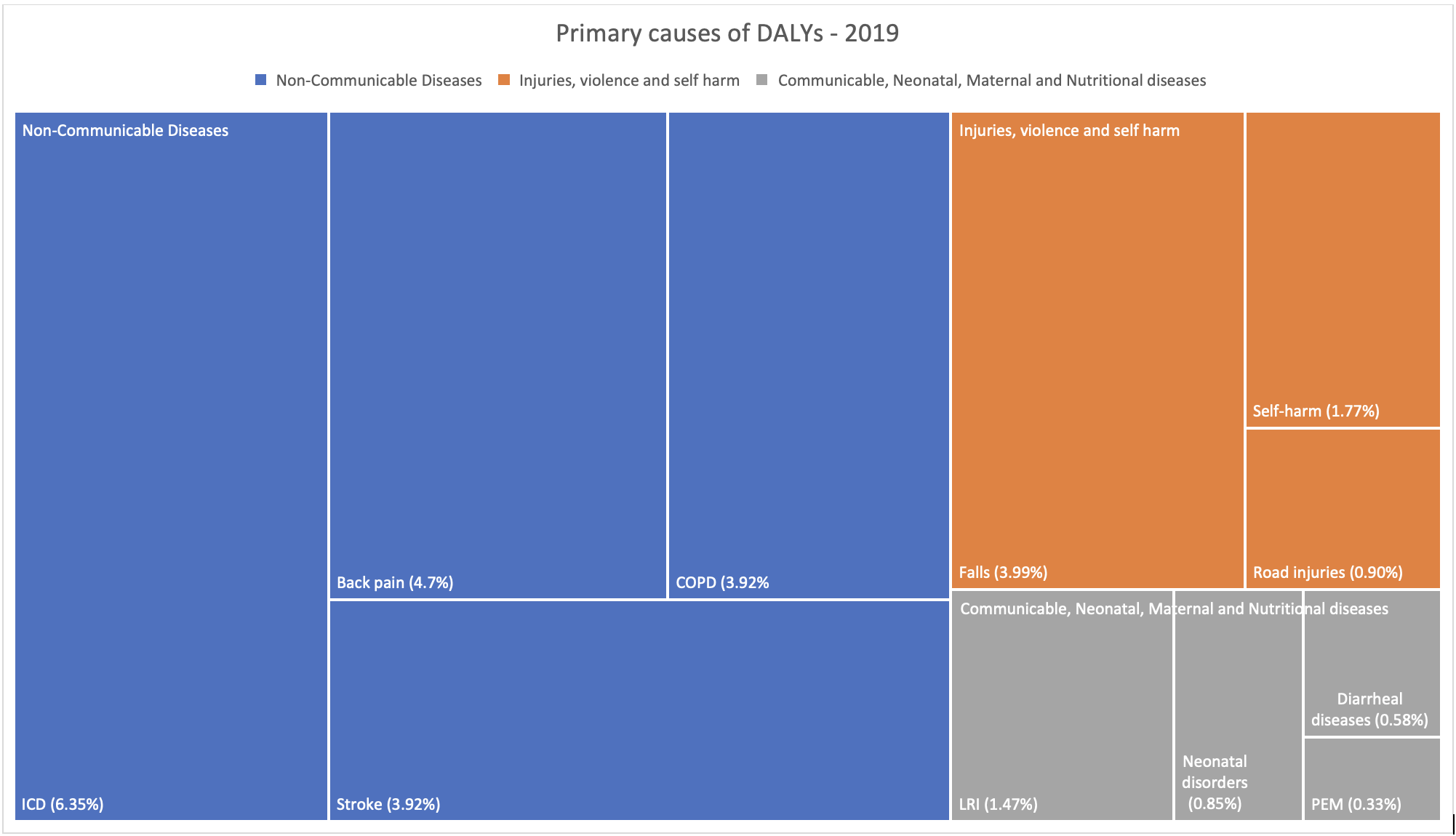
Fig 1. The primary causes of DALYs in Norway in 2019.

Disability Adjusted Life Years (DALYs) is a measure of the burden of disease and an indicator of health status. It is described as "the sum of years lost due to premature death and years lived with disability". The burden of disease is divided into three categories, non-communicable diseases; injuries, including violence and self-harm; communicable, neonatal, maternal and nutritional diseases.

In Norway, the DALYs per percent has been dominated by Non-communicable diseases, NCDs, as displayed in Fig 1 (blue). Ischemic heart disease (IHD) has the highest share with 6.35% of total DALYs. IHD has remained as the leading cause of DALYs in both 1990 and 2019, although its prevalence has been decreasing. Back pain has the second largest share of 4.7% of total DALYs, followed by COPD and stroke that both have 3.92% of total DALYs. As shown in the table below, the DALYs lost by strokes have decreased in 2019.

Injuries, including violence and self harm has led to the second most share of total DALYs. Falls have the largest share within this area with 3.99% of total DALYs and has been slightly increasing. This is followed by self-harm with 1.77% and road injuries with 0.9 of total DALYs, both decreasing.

Communicable, neonatal, maternal and nutritional diseases have the smallest share of the total DALYs. The primary cause within this area is lower respiratory infections with 1.47% of total DALYs. Lower respiratory infections was one of the top ten causes of DALYs in 1990. However, it no longer remains in the top ten as its prevalence has decreased throughout the years. The neonatal disorders with 0.85% of total DALYs have also been decreasing, while diarrheal diseases are increasing with 0.58% of total DALYs. Within this group it is protein energy malnutrition that has the highest annual increase of 2.41% with total DALYs of 0.33%.

Top 10 causes of DALYs in Norway, both sexes, all ages
1990	2019
1 Ischemic heart disease	1 Ischemic heart disease
2 Stroke	2 Low back pain
3 Low back pain	3 Falls
4 Falls	4 COPD
5 Lung cancer	5 Stroke
6 Lower respiratory infections	6 Lung cancer
7 Self-harm	7 Diabetes
8 Colorectal cancer	8 Headache disorders
9 Headache disorders	9 Colorectal cancer
10 Anxiety disorders	10 Anxiety disorders

== See also ==
- Healthcare in Norway
- COVID-19 pandemic in Norway
