= Health in Iceland =

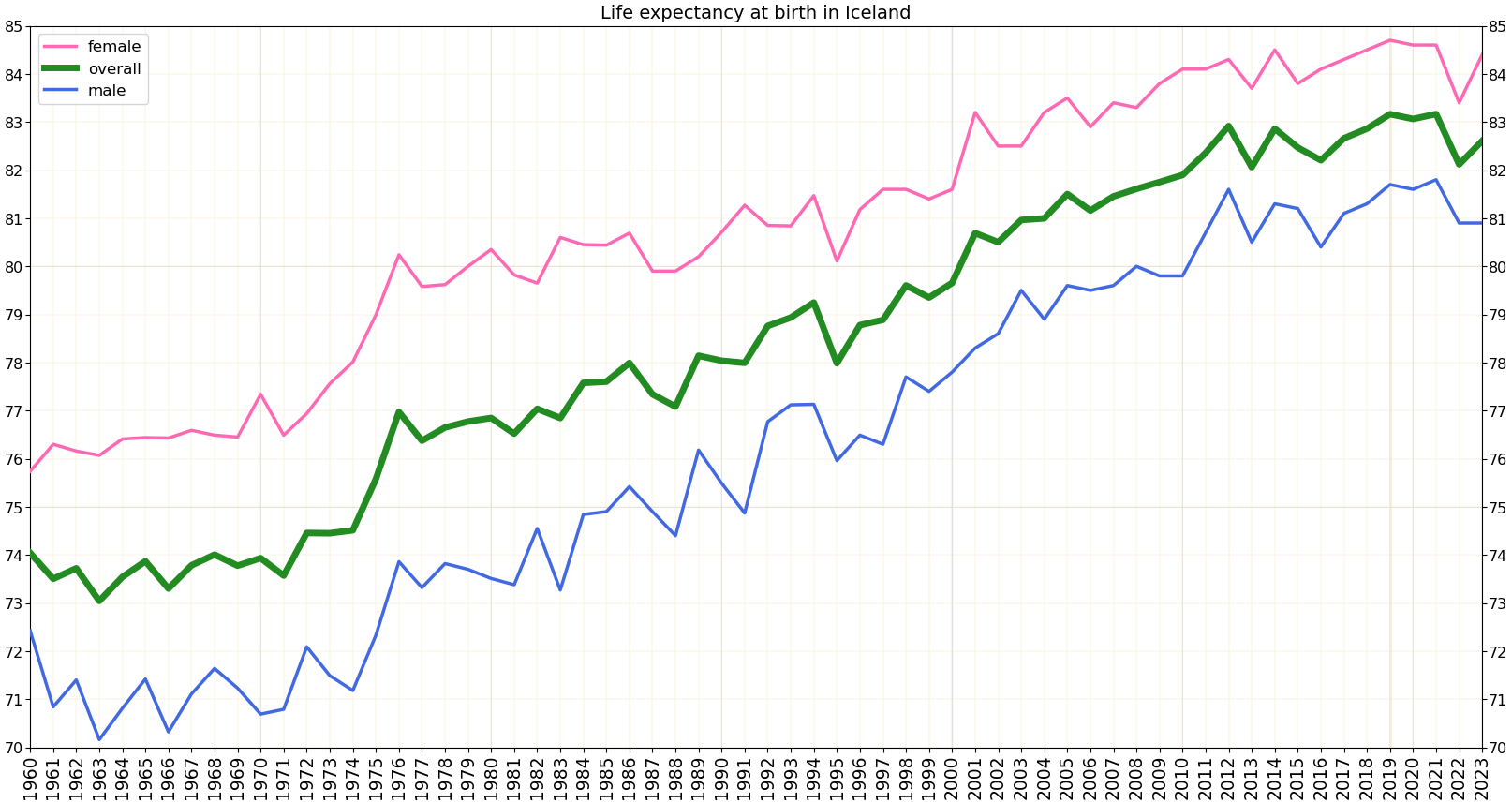
Life expectancy at birth in Iceland

Iceland had the third-lowest crude mortality rate in Europe, at 355 per 100,000 population in 2015. It had the lowest rate of male smokers in Europe: 17%.

A new measure of expected human capital calculated for 195 countries from 1990 to 2016 and defined for each birth cohort as the expected years lived from ages 20 to 64 and adjusted for educational attainment, learning or education quality, and functional health status was published by the Lancet in September 2018. Iceland had the second highest level of expected human capital with 27 health, education, and learning-adjusted expected years lived between ages 20 and 64.

== Life expectancy ==
Iceland had the highest life expectancy of any European country: 83.0 years in 2012 according to the OECD.

== See also ==
- Healthcare in Iceland
- Smoking in Iceland
