= Health in Cyprus =

In 2006, life expectancy for males in Cyprus was 79 and for females 82 years. Infant mortality in 2002 was 5 per 1,000 live births, comparing favourably to most developed nations.

A systematic population analysis of deaths in the adult population (ages 15–59) and released in 2010 in The Lancet place Cyprus as the country with the lowest mortality in females and 14th lowest mortality in males.

A new measure of expected human capital calculated for 195 countries from 1990 to 2016 and defined for each birth cohort as the expected years lived from age 20 to 64 years and adjusted for educational attainment, learning or education quality, and functional health status was published by The Lancet in September 2018. Cyprus had the twentieth highest level of expected human capital with 24 health, education, and learning-adjusted expected years lived between age 20 and 64 years.

== Major diagnoses ==
The three most common causes of death are circulatory disease, neoplasms, and respiratory disease. The two most common cancers are prostate cancer and breast cancer. The measles immunisation rate of 86% for one year olds is below the WHO European region average rate and second lowest in the EU.

== Health indicators ==
Life expectancy at birth in Cyprus

As of 2013, life expectancy for females was 85 and for males 80. Infant mortality in 2002 was 5 per 1,000 live births, comparing favourably to most developed nations. A systematic population analysis of deaths in the adult population (ages 15–59) and released in 2010 in The Lancet, place Cyprus as the country with the lowest mortality for females and 14th lowest mortality for males.

== Diabetes ==
In 2015 it was estimated that 10.2% of the population has diabetes, costing about $2,295 per person per year.

== Smoking ==
Smoking rates in Cyprus are considered high by international standards. WHO Statistics from 1998 show that 38.5% of males were smokers.

== See also ==
- Healthcare in Cyprus
