= Health in the Czech Republic =

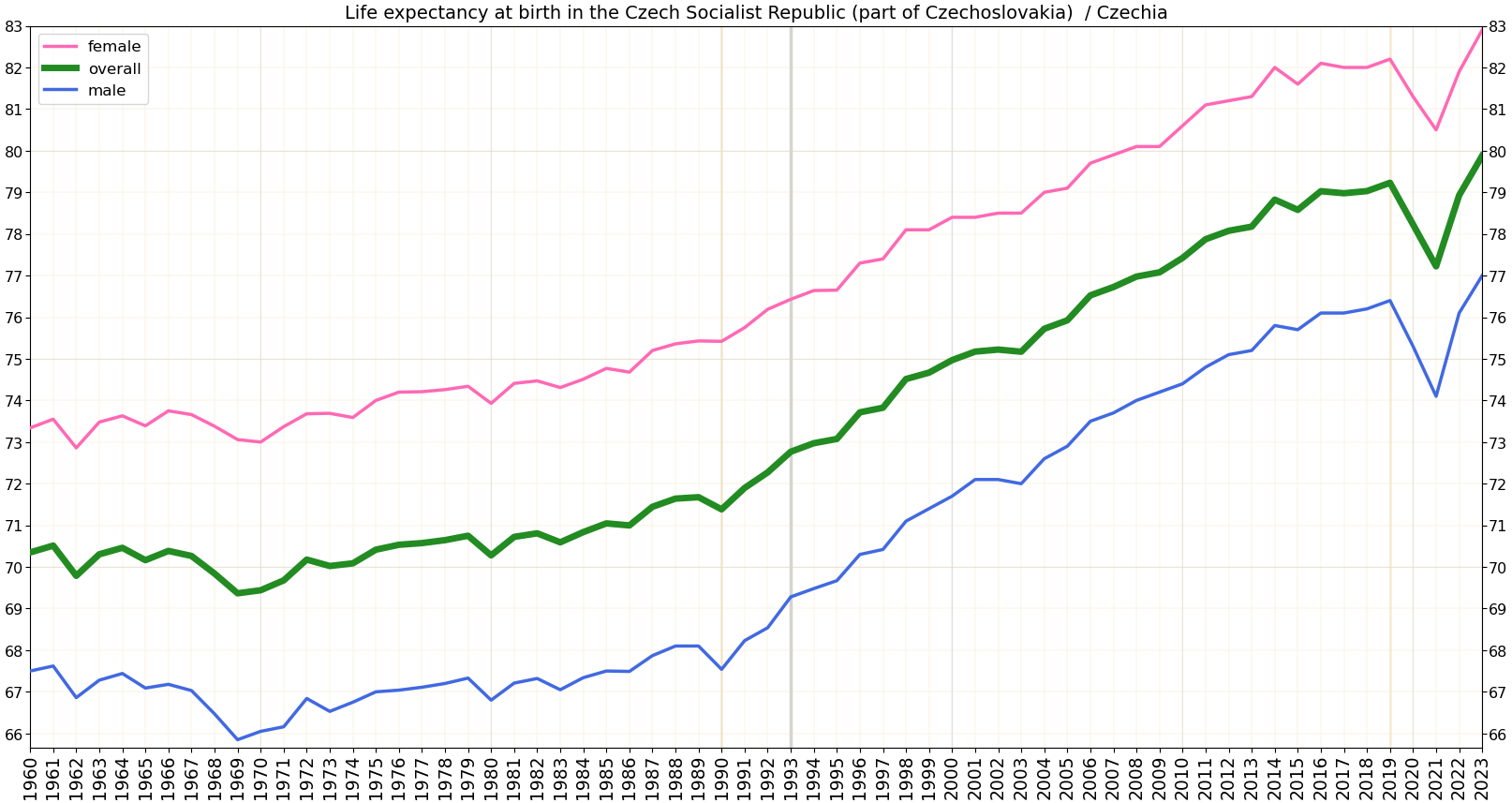
Life expectancy at birth in Czechia

The Czech Republic had the second highest rate of obesity in Europe in 2015. 28.7% of the adult population had a body mass index of 30 or more.
