= Health in Jamaica =

Jamaica’s health care has had a weak history, however has been improving and continuing to improve. Part of this is from the fact that close to half of the healthcare workers from the area are leaving for the better opportunities that are offered elsewhere. The other cause comes from Jamaica’s history. Jamaica’s weak healthcare started back when Jamaica was still a colony that depended on enslaved people, and has been slowly improving ever since. Covid-19 and sickle cell have affected Jamaica heavily, but their statistics continue to improve. Jamaica has received help from various countries and corporations to improve their healthcare system.

== History ==
=== During slavery ===
The rise of healthcare in Jamaica begins with its colonial history. Jamaica became a colony under England in 1707 and was not granted independence until 1962. It was mainly used for sugarcane production as well as cotton, coffee, and indigo plantations. This made the economy boom and became a useful source of income for England. The enslaved population exponentially grew during this time and grew to outnumber the free population. Healthcare for this population was not a concern considering the terms of slavery, but attention was brought for pregnancy because infant mortality was profound. At the Worthy Park Estate in St. Catherine between 1787-1792 the rate of survival of the first year of infancy was 520/1000 and the still-birth rate was 211/1000. During these years abolishment of slavery was around the corner which prompted slave owners to care for their “stock” and many estates deployed physicians for their slaves. Some changes were made such as reassigning pregnant women to lighter tasks and rewarding them for having more than five children but these physicians did not combat diseases or the poor diet of this population. At this time there were only two hospitals which were each maintained by nine individuals, one being a physician and five being slaves, that treated slaves and anyone with minimum care. When slavery was abolished however many estates stopped employing physicians and the number dropped from 300 to 75. This began the closure of the estate health system as many former slaves left the estates which slowly opened the door to the Island Medical Service being established in 1875 to care for former slaves and the indentured servant population. By 1903 40 district medical officers were appointed, but healthcare was not the primary concern as Jamaica was now developing as a country and was plagued with one of the world’s worst natural disasters in 1907 with the Kingston Earthquake.

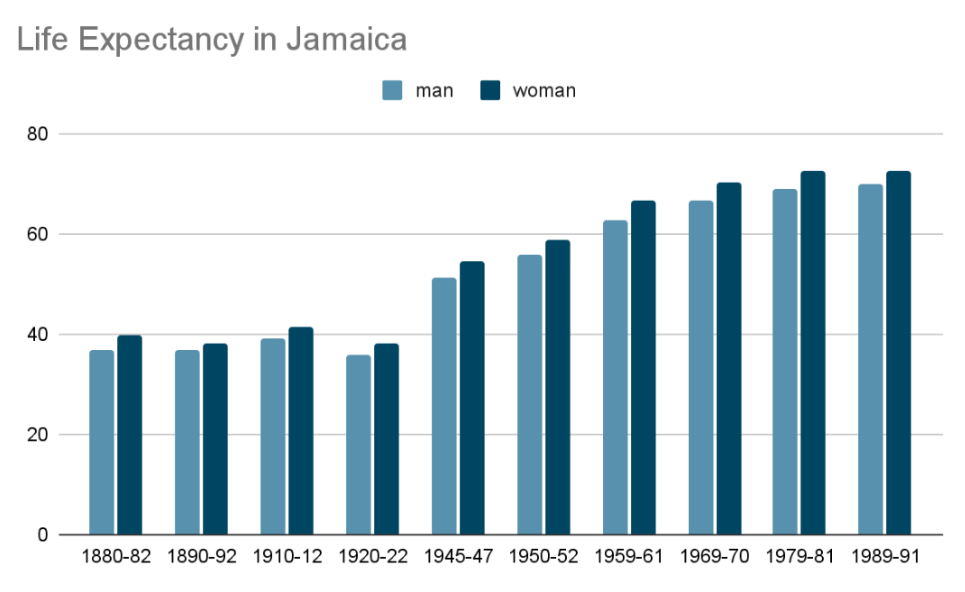
Life expectancy in Jamaica, 1880-1990

=== After Abolition. ===
Life expectancy in Jamaica as new healthcare systems came about did not change, which led to the government calling on the Rockefeller Foundation to help in combating infectious diseases. Diseases such as tuberculosis and malaria plagued Jamaica and were a leading factor in death, but through island-wide studies and patient care, these diseases diminished. It also brought about institutions such as the Bureau of Health education, which sought to combat diseases through education, but in its establishment also brought many opportunities to work for these institutions.

The Rockefeller Foundation provided fellowships for training to upgrade staff leading to universities in health. Social unrest brought about the Moyne Commission, a commission set up by colonial Britain to figure out why the riots in 1938 had happened. The Moyne Commission advocated for a school of hygiene which started the Training Station for Sanitary Inspectors and Health Visitors which trained public health nurses and public health inspectors. These contributions led to the development of the health curriculum in Jamaican universities such as the College of West Indies. It had its first class of 33 aspiring doctors in 1948.

=== Post-Independence ===
The United Kingdom did not roll its National Health Service out to its colonies although it drew heavily on health care workers from these areas (see the Windrush generation). Due to the riots of 1938, political parties within Jamaica formed which were strong enough to break away from colonial rule in 1962. After this large scale healthcare reforms started to be put in place such as the National Insurance Act. Ratified in 1970 this brought a national insurance which would provide compensation to work related injury or death and included an “old age benefit” along with widow/orphan benefits. This targeted the working population only however and they were quick to expand in 1972 with a more expanded health system and new welfare services. In 1974 plans of a National Health System were amongst debate but for economic and political reasons it was not incorporated leaving little improvement in this sector until 1997 when the National Health Services act was passed. This decentralized the health sector in Jamaica allowing to set up regional hospitals and more efficiently deliver healthcare to its citizens. This set the table for the National Health Services Act to be passed in 2003 which created a tax funded government healthcare system. There are taxes on tobacco/alcohol as well as payroll and other amenities like petroleum. Tobacco was a larger factor until 2006 when a tobacco company moved its operations and now payroll tax is the leading factor. There are many programs available in the form of cards in which possessing could subside or provide medication for the top diseases as well as access to healthcare facilities. They also fund private institutions in terms of health education and promotion. This has grown for Jamaica to have a stable healthcare system with some 250 plus clinics and 24 government hospitals. Although hospitals vary from region depending on financials and staffing often leading people to private doctors, only 30% of the population was enrolled in this healthcare system pre covid (2018–19). The National Health Fund has a “securing the future” strategic plan until 2030 to evaluate improvements to the system. This involves weighing in on taxation as it is a major contributor, but due to the weak tax system it is hard to make major jumps. The NHF however is a major stepping stone in universal healthcare for Jamaica considering its history from the colonial ages to independence and has the power to do good.

== Policies and corporations ==
Many other countries and companies have worked with Jamaica to help improve their healthcare system. The University of South Florida Morsani College of Medicine travels to the University of West Indies (UWI) and the University of West Indies Hospital, the largest hospital in Jamaica, to help and improve their hospital. The USF helps by doing things like help train oncology nurses. They are also helping to create a Cancer Center of Excellence. USF’s main goal is to help improve the patient outcomes, delivery, and care.

More countries and corporations such as the EU, PEPFAR, Japan, Caribbean Development Bank, World Bank, Spain, and many more are working with Jamaica to help strengthen their healthcare system. Along with this, Jamaica has implemented a program called the National Development Plan Vision 2030, The Action Plan for the Prevention and Control of Cancer in Jamaica, the Medium-Term Socio-Economic Framework 2017-2020, the WHO Country Cooperation Strategy Agenda, and various other plans. All of these have different goals and ways of achieving these goals designed to improve Jamaica’s health care system. The WHO Cooperation Strategy Agenda focuses on the resilience of the health programs, inclusive healthy lifestyle, integrated approach for both economic and social determinants, and environmental determinants of health.

== Diseases ==
Health care in Jamaica is free to all citizens and legal residents at the public hospitals and clinics. This can include the cost of prescribed medications. There are long queues at public health facilities. An audit in 2015 identified shortages of manpower, equipment, medications, wheelchairs, stretchers, gloves, beds, and other essential supplies. 3.3% of the national budget is spent on health services.

Sickle-cell disease is the most common inherited blood disease in Jamaica. It is a bloodborne disease caused by changes in genes that produce hemoglobin, an iron rich compound. The hemoglobin causes the blood cell to form a crescent, sickle-like shape. This causes anemia, pain, and blockages in blood flow. This disease has to be passed down from both parents for a child to inherit the disease. There has been newborn screening for sickle cell disease in Jamaica since 1973. Although only 40% of babies with sickle cell will benefit from the screening. Because of this, there have been movements of the Sickle Cell Care Unit balancing the limited resources and increased survival rates. There are ways to prevent pneumococcal infection with penicillin prophylaxis and vaccines. Taking penicillin twice a day, or by taking another source of penicillin, benzathine every 28 days. These medications are given from age four months to four years and can be stopped once reached age 4. The vaccine is the strongest to fight the infection. Since fees for public health facilities have been banned since 2008, out of pocket payments for these treatments have been lowered. Many of the tests for Sickle Cell can be done in any of the hospitals in Jamaica.

== COVID-19 pandemic ==
The COVID-19 pandemic had a significant influence on Jamaica. It is now the third leading cause of death in the country. In 2020, when the outbreak occurred there were 12,827 total cases of COVID-19, with 302 reported deaths. This number dramatically increased the next year with 81,093 cases in 2021, and 2,171 deaths. Jamaica was ranked 34th in the region of the Americas in terms of number of deaths caused by COVID-19.

Jamaica utilized the vaccine, and by December 2021 at least one dose of the vaccine was given to 26.6% of the population. As of April 2022, 23% of the population completed the vaccination cycle. As a result of the large impact of COVID-19 on Jamaica, the government undertook a COVID-19 response and recovery plan for poor and vulnerable communities. They aimed to support business development and create jobs to repair the economy.

== Statistics ==
In 2023, Jamaica's population was 2,839,786. The life expectancy at birth has decreased by 4.08 years from 2000 to 2021 (74.2 years to 70.1 years), Stroke is the leading cause of death in the country with a reported 124 deaths each year. Diabetes mellitus is the second main cause of death with a reported 94 deaths each year. In 2023, Jamaica had 2.38 suicides per 100,000 each year.

In 2022, road deaths were 17.8 per 100,000 per year. Maternal mortality increased 19.1% from 2000 to 2020, to 98.9 deaths per 1,000 live births. In 2024, women had an average of 1.4 children. In 2020 the infant mortality rate was 16.7 deaths per 1,000 live births.

In Jamaica there are over 330 health centers, 24 public hospitals, the University Hospital of the West Indies, a regional teaching institution partially funded by regional governments including Jamaica, 10 private hospitals and over 495 pharmacies. There are around 5,000 public hospital beds and about 200 in the private sector. See List of hospitals in Jamaica.

== Aging population ==
In 2023, people over 65 years of age made up 8.2% of the population. In 2024, there are 43.9 older people per 100 children. The population of people over the age of 60 has increased while the population of children under 15 has decreased. In 2022, there were more females than males, with 102.2 females per 100 men.
