= Health in Estonia =

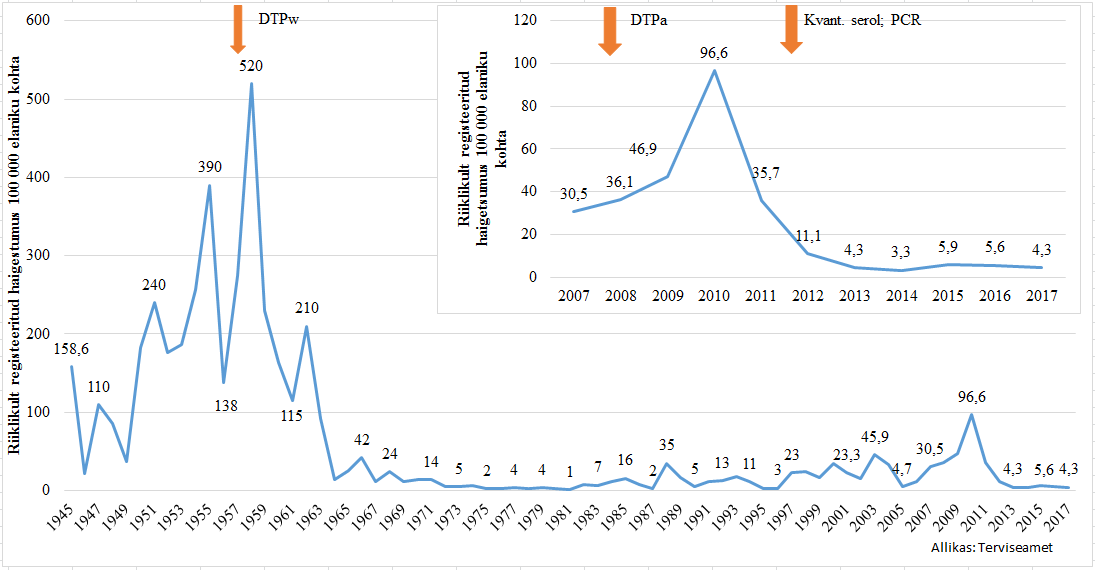
Nationally registered incidence of whooping cough in Estonia 1945-2017

A new measure of expected human capital calculated for 195 countries from 1990 to 2016 and defined for each birth cohort as the expected years lived from age 20 to 64 years and adjusted for educational attainment, learning or education quality, and functional health status was published by The Lancet in September 2018. Estonia had the seventeenth highest level of expected human capital with 24 health, education, and learning-adjusted expected years lived between age 20 and 64 years.

== See also ==
- Healthcare in Estonia
- Great Famine of Estonia (1695–97)
- COVID-19 pandemic in Estonia
