= List of countries by infant and under-five mortality rates =

Under-5 mortality rates per 1000 live births, 2023

The under-five mortality rate (U5MR) is the number of deaths of infants and children under five years old per 1000 live births. The under-five mortality rate for the world is 39 deaths according to the World Bank and the World Health Organization (WHO). 5.3 million children under age five died in 2018, 14,722 every day.

The infant mortality rate is the number of deaths of infants under one year old per 1,000 live births. This rate is often used as an indicator of the level of health in a country. The infant mortality rate of the world in 2019 was 28 according to the United Nations and the projected estimate for 2020 was 30.8 according to the CIA World Factbook.

Note that due to differences in reporting, these numbers may not be comparable across countries. The WHO recommendation is that all children who show signs of life should be recorded as live births. In many countries this standard is not followed, artificially lowering their infant mortality rates relative to countries which follow those standards.

== Under-five mortality from the World Bank ==
The World Bank has 2024 data by country.

World average of Under-five mortality rate is 36.7 per 1,000 live births, according to 2023 estimates.

Under-five mortality (deaths/1,000 live births) – 2023 estimates.
Location	2023 rate
Afghanistan	55.5
Albania	9.4
Algeria	22.0
Andorra	2.6
Angola	64.0
Antigua and Barbuda	9.3
Argentina	9.6
Armenia	10.0
Australia	3.7
Austria	3.1
Azerbaijan	18.6
Bahamas, The	12.7
Bahrain	8.6
Bangladesh	30.6
Barbados	10.0
Belarus	2.4
Belgium	3.6
Belize	12.7
Benin	77.9
Bhutan	23.1
Bolivia	23.1
Bosnia and Herzegovina	6.0
Botswana	39.6
Brazil	14.4
Brunei	9.4
Bulgaria	6.1
Burkina Faso	77.3
Burundi	49.2
Cape Verde	11.6
Cambodia	22.9
Cameroon	67.2
Canada	5.1
Central African Republic	92.2
Chad	101.1
Chile	7.2
China	6.2
Colombia	12.0
Comoros	39.8
Congo, Democratic Republic of the	73.2
Congo, Republic of the	40.5
Costa Rica	7.9
Cote d'Ivoire	67.1
Croatia	4.6
Cuba	8.3
Cyprus	3.5
Czech Republic	2.6
Denmark	3.4
Djibouti	50.4
Dominica	35.5
Dominican Republic	31.4
Ecuador	13.1
Egypt	17.5
El Salvador	10.4
Equatorial Guinea	70.6
Eritrea	35.4
Estonia	2.1
Eswatini (Swaziland)	45.0
Ethiopia	46.5
Fiji	29.1
Finland	2.3
France	4.3
Gabon	33.2
Gambia, The	44.1
Georgia	9.2
Germany	3.7
Ghana	37.1
Greece	3.7
Grenada	18.3
Guatemala	21.4
Guinea-Bissau	69.3
Guinea	95.0
Guyana	25.7
Haiti	55.1
Honduras	15.5
Hungary	3.8
Iceland	2.6
India	27.7
Indonesia	20.6
Iran	11.8
Iraq	22.6
Ireland	3.8
Israel	3.4
Italy	2.8
Jamaica	19.3
Japan	2.4
Jordan	13.2
Kazakhstan	9.6
Kenya	39.9
Kiribati	55.1
Korea, North	18.0
Korea, South	2.8
Kuwait	8.8
Kyrgyzstan	17.0
Laos	39.0
Latvia	3.0
Lebanon	18.3
Lesotho	58.9
Liberia	72.9
Libya	30.8
Lithuania	3.4
Luxembourg	2.3
Madagascar	64.8
Malawi	38.3
Malaysia	8.1
Maldives	5.7
Mali	91.3
Malta	5.5
Marshall Islands	28.2
Mauritania	37.8
Mauritius	15.2
Mexico	12.5
Micronesia, Federated States of	23.1
Moldova	14.7
Monaco	2.7
Mongolia	13.6
Montenegro	2.6
Morocco	16.6
Mozambique	61.7
Myanmar	38.7
Namibia	40.7
Nauru	8.9
Nepal	26.5
Netherlands	4.0
New Zealand	4.7
Nicaragua	13.4
Niger	114.8
Nigeria	104.9
North Macedonia	3.3
Norway	2.4
Oman	10.4
Pakistan	58.5
Palau	22.3
Panama	13.3
Papua New Guinea	40.3
Paraguay	17.0
Peru	15.8
Philippines	26.9
Poland	4.4
Portugal	3.2
Qatar	6.0
Romania	6.6
Russia	4.5
Rwanda	40.0
Saint Kitts and Nevis	16.3
Saint Lucia	15.5
Saint Vincent and the Grenadines	10.6
Samoa	15.7
San Marino	1.4
Sao Tome and Principe	13.9
Saudi Arabia	6.2
Senegal	38.5
Serbia	5.2
Seychelles	14.3
Sierra Leone	94.8
Singapore	2.1
Slovakia	6.1
Slovenia	2.2
Solomon Islands	20.6
Somalia	104.0
South Africa	34.7
South Sudan	98.7
Spain	3.1
Sri Lanka	6.1
Sudan	50.1
Suriname	16.2
Sweden	2.5
Switzerland	3.9
Syria	20.6
Tajikistan	27.3
Tanzania	38.9
Thailand	9.2
Timor-Leste	50.0
Togo	58.3
Tonga	9.9
Trinidad and Tobago	19.1
Tunisia	12.9
Turkey	12.8
Turkmenistan	40.0
Tuvalu	19.9
Uganda	38.8
Ukraine	8.1
United Arab Emirates	5.0
United Kingdom	3.9
United States	6.5
Uruguay	6.7
Uzbekistan	13.3
Vanuatu	16.8
Venezuela	24.3
Vietnam	20.0
Palestine	26.3
Yemen	39.3
Zambia	44.7
Zimbabwe	44.2

== OECD. Under-five mortality from the World Bank ==
The following is a list of OECD countries and their under-five mortality rate per 1,000 live births as published by the World Bank.

Under-five mortality rate per 1,000 live births (OECD-World Bank, 2020)
Location	2020 rate
Australia	3.7
Austria	3.6
Belgium	4.2
Canada	5.0
Chile	6.8
Colombia	13.2
Czech Republic	2.9
Denmark	3.6
Estonia	2.1
Finland	2.2
France	4.4
Germany	3.7
Greece	4.1
Hungary	4.0
Iceland	1.9
Ireland	3.0
Israel	3.6
Italy	2.9
Japan	2.5
Latvia	4.0
Lithuania	3.3
Luxembourg	2.8
Mexico	13.7
Netherlands	4.0
New Zealand	4.2
Norway	2.2
Poland	4.4
Portugal	3.3
Slovak Republic	5.8
Slovenia	2.2
South Korea	3.0
Spain	3.2
Sweden	2.6
Switzerland	4.0
Turkey	9.5
United Kingdom	4.2
United States	6.3
Average	6.8

== Infant mortality from the CIA World Factbook ==
Note: The link in the last column takes you close to the same country in the UN table in the next section.

Asterisk (*) indicates "Health in LOCATION" links.

Infant mortality (deaths/1,000 live births) – 2018 and 2020 estimates.
Location	CIA. 2018 estimates	CIA. 2020 estimates	To UN estimates
Afghanistan *	108.5	104.3	->
Albania *	11.6	10.8	->
Algeria *	18.9	17.6	->
American Samoa (US)	10.8	9.9	->
Andorra *	3.6	3.5	->
Angola *	65.8	62.3	->
Anguilla (UK) *	3.3	3.3	->
Antigua and Barbuda *	11.7	11.1	->
Argentina *	9.5	9.0	->
Armenia *	12.3	11.5	->
Aruba (Netherlands)	10.4	9.8	->
Australia *	4.2	3.1	->
Austria *	3.4	3.3	->
Azerbaijan *	23.0	21.3	->
Bahamas	11.1	10.6	->
Bahrain *	8.8	8.3	->
Bangladesh *	30.5	28.3	->
Barbados *	10.0	9.6	->
Belarus *	3.6	3.5	->
Belgium *	3.4	3.3	->
Belize *	12.0	11.2	->
Benin *	51.5	58.7	->
Bermuda (UK) *	2.5	2.5	->
Bhutan *	30.3	27.0	->
Bolivia *	34.2	32.2	->
Bosnia and Herzegovina *	5.4	5.2	->
Botswana *	28.6	26.8	->
Brazil *	11.0	10.5	->
British Virgin Islands (UK)	11.7	11.0	->
Brunei *	9.3	8.8	->
Bulgaria *	8.3	8.1	->
Burkina Faso *	54.7	52.0	->
Burundi *	57.4	40.1	->
Cape Verde *	21.1	19.7	->
Cambodia *	46.1	43.7	->
Cameroon *	49.8	51.5	->
Canada *	4.5	4.3	->
Cayman Islands (UK) *	5.7	5.5	->
Central African Republic *	84.3	80.6	->
Chad *	71.7	68.6	->
Chile *	6.4	6.2	->
China *	11.8	11.4	->
Colombia *	13.2	12.3	->
Comoros *	58.3	55.0	->
DR Congo *	69.8	64.5	->
Congo *	53.5	50.7	->
Cook Islands (New Zealand)	12.6	11.9	->
Costa Rica *	7.8	7.5	->
Ivory Coast *	62.6	59.1	->
Croatia *	9.1	8.6	->
Cuba *	4.4	4.3	->
Cyprus *	7.7	7.4	->
Czech Republic *	2.6	2.6	->
Denmark *	3.2	3.2	->
Djibouti *	44.3	41.6	->
Dominica *	10.3	9.7	->
Dominican Republic *	22.7	20.9	->
Ecuador *	15.9	15.0	->
Egypt *	18.3	17.1	->
El Salvador *	16.3	11.8	->
Equatorial Guinea *	63.3	59.7	->
Eritrea *	44.4	43.3	->
Estonia *	3.8	3.7	->
Eswatini (Swaziland) *	46.6	42.8	->
Ethiopia *	48.3	35.8	->
Faroe Islands (Denmark)	5.3	5.1	->
Fiji *	9.3	8.8	->
Finland *	2.5	2.5	->
France *	3.2	3.2	->
French Polynesia (France)	4.6	4.5	->
Gabon *	32.9	30.4	->
Gambia	58.4	54.9	->
Gaza Strip *	16.0	14.9	->
Georgia *	14.7	13.8	->
Germany *	3.4	3.3	->
Ghana *	34.1	32.1	->
Gibraltar (UK) *	5.8	5.6	->
Greece *	4.5	3.7	->
Greenland (Denmark) *	8.7	8.3	->
Grenada *	9.4	8.9	->
list+link|Health in|Guam|name=Guam (US)	11.9	10.8	->
Guatemala *	23.3	21.8	->
Guernsey (UK) *	3.4	3.3	->
Guinea-Bissau *	54.8	51.9	->
Guinea *	55.3	52.4	->
Guyana *	29.5	27.6	->
Haiti *	45.4	42.6	->
Honduras *	16.7	14.6	->
Hong Kong *	2.7	2.7	->
Hungary *	4.8	4.7	->
Iceland *	2.1	2.1	->
India *	37.8	35.4	->
Indonesia *	21.9	20.4	->
Iran *	15.5	14.9	->
Iraq *	37.5	19.5	->
Ireland *	3.6	3.6	->
Isle of Man (UK) *	4.0	3.9	->
Israel *	3.4	3.3	->
Italy *	3.2	3.2	->
Jamaica *	12.4	11.6	->
Japan *	2.0	1.9	->
Jersey (UK) *	3.7	3.6	->
Jordan *	13.7	12.8	->
Kazakhstan *	19.0	17.9	->
Kenya *	36.1	29.8	->
Kiribati *	31.1	29.2	->
North Korea *	21.4	20.0	->
South Korea *	3.0	3	->
Kuwait *	6.8	6.5	->
Kyrgyzstan *	25.0	23.3	->
Laos *	48.4	45.6	->
Latvia *	5.1	5.0	->
Lebanon *	7.2	6.8	->
Lesotho *	44.6	41.5	->
Liberia *	50.6	47.4	->
Libya *	10.5	11.5	->
Liechtenstein *	4.2	4.2	->
Lithuania *	3.8	3.8	->
Luxembourg *	3.4	3.3	->
Macau *	3.1	3.1	->
North Macedonia *	7.8	7.4	->
Madagascar *	40.1	37.8	->
Malawi *	42.1	39.5	->
Malaysia *	12.1	11.4	->
Maldives *	21.3	19.8	->
Mali *	67.6	64.0	->
Malta *	4.7	4.6	->
Marshall Islands *	18.7	17.4	->
Mauritania *	50.5	47.9	->
Mauritius *	9.5	9.0	->
Mexico *	11.3	10.7	->
Federated States of Micronesia *	19.1	17.8	->
Moldova *	11.7	11.1	->
Monaco *	1.8	1.9	->
Mongolia *	20.5	19.2	->
Montserrat (UK)	11.9	11.1	->
Morocco *	21.1	18.2	->
Mozambique *	64.0	64.7	->
Myanmar *	34.4	31.7	->
Namibia *	33.8	31.4	->
Nauru *	7.7	7.4	->
Nepal *	26.9	25.1	->
Netherlands *	3.5	3.5	->
New Caledonia (France)	5.2	5.0	->
New Zealand *	4.4	3.5	->
Nicaragua *	17.7	16.5	->
Nigeria *	63.3	59.8	->
Niger *	79.4	67.7	->
Northern Mariana Islands (US)	12.3	11.5	->
Norway *	2.5	2.5	->
Oman *	12.4	11.7	->
Pakistan *	50.4	52.3	->
Palau	10.3	9.8	->
Panama *	9.6	9.1	->
Papua New Guinea *	35.3	33.2	->
Paraguay *	18.1	16.9	->
Peru *	17.8	16.7	->
Philippines *	20.9	20.0	->
Poland *	4.4	4.3	->
Portugal *	2.6	2.6	->
Puerto Rico (US) *	6.3	6.0	->
Qatar *	6.0	5.7	->
Romania *	9.2	8.7	->
Russia *	6.7	6.5	->
Rwanda *	29.1	28.0	->
Saint Helena (UK) *	12.8	12.0	->
Saint Kitts and Nevis *	8.2	7.8	->
Saint Lucia *	10.6	10.1	->
Saint Pierre and Miquelon (France)	6.4	6.1	->
Saint Vincent and the Grenadines *	11.7	11.0	->
Samoa *	18.0	17.0	->
San Marino *	4.3	4.2	->
São Tomé and Príncipe *	44.1	41.7	->
Saudi Arabia *	12.1	11.3	->
Senegal *	48.0	45.7	->
Serbia *	5.7	5.6	->
Seychelles *	9.7	9.3	->
Sierra Leone *	66.7	63.6	->
Singapore *	2.3	2.3	->
Slovakia *	5.0	4.9	->
Slovenia *	1.6	1.7	->
Solomon Islands *	14.3	13.4	->
Somalia *	93.0	89.5	->
South Africa *	29.9	27.8	->
South Sudan *	90.4	69.9	->
Spain *	3.3	3.2	->
Sri Lanka *	8.2	7.8	->
Sudan *	44.2	41.8	->
Suriname *	23.7	22.1	->
Sweden *	2.6	2.6	->
Switzerland *	3.6	3.5	->
Syria *	14.4	16.5	->
Taiwan *	4.3	4.2	->
Tajikistan *	30.8	28.8	->
Tanzania *	38.7	36.4	->
Thailand *	9.0	8.6	->
Timor-Leste *	33.9	31.7	->
Togo *	40.8	38.5	->
Tonga *	10.9	11.3	->
Trinidad and Tobago *	21.6	20.1	->
Tunisia *	11.7	11.0	->
Turkey *	16.9	15.8	->
Turkmenistan *	33.1	30.8	->
Turks and Caicos Islands (UK)	9.8	9.3	->
Tuvalu *	28.2	26.6	->
Uganda *	54.6	32.6	->
Ukraine *	7.7	7.4	->
United Arab Emirates *	5.5	5.3	->
United Kingdom *	4.2	4.1	->
United States *	5.7	5.3	->
Uruguay *	8.1	7.8	->
Uzbekistan *	17.4	16.3	->
Vanuatu *	13.9	12.7	->
Venezuela *	11.9	27.9	->
Vietnam *	16.7	15.7	->
U.S. Virgin Islands (US)	7.7	7.4	->
Wallis and Futuna (France)	4.3	4.2	->
West Bank	13.6	12.8	->
Western Sahara *	50.5	47.9	->
Yemen *	44.6	41.9	->
Zambia *	59.3	56.0	->
Zimbabwe *	31.9	30.3	->

== Infant mortality from the United Nations population division (from birth to 1 year-olds only) ==
Note: The link in the last column takes you close to the same country in the CIA table in the previous section.

Infant mortality (deaths/1,000 live births) — longitudinal data — the 2019 revision
Location (Note: Countries are ranked based on last two columns average calculated in order to make the rank more independent from fluctuations in any single (most recent) column, particularly as the 2015-2020 data is preliminary.)	1950- 1955	1955- 1960	1960- 1965	1965- 1970	1970- 1975	1975- 1980	1980- 1985	1985- 1990	1990- 1995	1995- 2000	2000- 2005	2005- 2010	2010- 2015	2015- 2020	To CIA estimates
Iceland	21.57	17.54	16.96	13.11	11.90	8.94	6.15	5.64	4.77	3.71	2.54	1.99	1.57	1.25	<-
Hong Kong (China)	61.89	46.26	33.58	24.66	16.68	12.91	9.50	7.26	5.20	3.60	2.52	1.86	1.59	1.32	<-
Singapore	60.96	43.15	28.59	23.75	19.33	12.85	8.77	5.47	4.81	3.73	2.50	2.15	2.07	1.63	<-
Finland	33.08	25.13	19.16	14.62	11.54	8.54	6.37	5.97	4.93	3.84	3.21	2.72	2.10	1.71	<-
Japan	47.67	36.12	24.70	15.93	11.59	8.48	6.42	4.85	4.40	3.66	2.98	2.55	2.18	1.76	<-
Slovenia	22.78	18.69	16.59	16.58	15.53	13.75	13.37	10.23	7.35	4.91	4.03	3.20	2.23	1.87	<-
Sweden	19.37	16.84	15.36	12.33	10.22	7.75	6.77	6.11	5.11	3.57	3.23	2.57	2.4	2.04	<-
Norway	21.69	18.73	16.65	13.53	11.10	8.77	7.99	8.04	5.51	3.98	3.46	3.00	2.45	2.07	<-
Czechia	42.18	23.35	20.40	21.63	20.13	17.45	14.45	11.35	8.99	5.47	3.96	3.08	2.53	2.27	<-
South Korea	159.09	95.74	73.36	56.51	38.74	33.60	25.17	15.65	10.30	6.90	5.01	3.51	2.97	2.11	<-
Estonia	85.29	49.64	33.41	23.52	21.09	21.85	20.27	18.24	16.34	11.97	7.27	4.75	3.20	1.99	<-
Spain	62.73	50.97	41.17	32.97	22.72	15.38	10.65	8.32	6.63	4.94	4.03	3.37	2.88	2.35	<-
Italy	59.07	47.97	40.16	32.49	25.83	17.16	12.42	9.29	7.43	5.48	4.14	3.43	3.04	2.60	<-
Macau (China)	65.86	56.33	44.32	34.82	26.48	19.52	15.00	11.41	8.76	6.40	4.92	3.80	3.06	2.62	<-
Portugal	91.99	87.60	77.37	60.79	45.35	29.82	19.55	13.80	9.13	6.37	4.50	3.32	2.95	2.96	<-
Netherlands	23.00	18.24	15.65	13.26	10.97	9.25	8.29	7.34	6.17	5.28	4.86	4.11	3.46	2.51	<-
Ireland	40.56	33.47	27.70	22.35	18.07	14.61	9.97	8.32	6.58	6.09	5.25	3.71	3.39	2.70	<-
Greece	45.80	41.19	38.03	33.61	24.98	20.82	14.71	11.52	8.45	6.61	4.55	3.48	3.28	2.82	<-
Israel	38.92	33.05	28.33	24.33	20.66	17.09	13.72	10.73	8.49	6.18	5.03	3.97	3.43	2.73	<-
Belgium	44.74	35.42	26.96	22.26	18.24	13.68	10.73	9.14	7.76	5.26	4.22	3.83	3.46	2.83	<-
Luxembourg	43.93	36.92	29.23	20.88	17.86	13.17	11.98	9.00	7.25	4.86	4.96	2.33	3.41	2.87	<-
Belarus	95.38	56.61	37.67	25.80	21.17	21.89	19.52	16.38	15.10	14.89	9.59	6.27	3.43	2.97	<-
Austria	53.14	42.35	31.85	26.10	23.78	16.24	12.20	9.15	6.88	4.74	4.47	3.76	3.33	3.15	<-
France	44.22	32.51	24.88	20.36	15.76	11.54	9.28	7.91	6.55	4.71	4.19	3.72	3.49	3.03	<-
Germany	46.36	38.54	30.23	22.61	20.80	15.52	11.07	8.28	5.99	4.76	4.15	3.66	3.36	3.19	<-
Denmark	27.71	23.25	20.17	15.77	12.09	8.91	7.83	8.01	6.25	4.92	4.55	3.73	3.51	3.13	<-
Australia	23.68	21.35	19.52	18.23	16.42	12.27	9.96	8.66	6.51	5.46	4.94	4.41	3.63	3.11	<-
Réunion (France)	141.65	109.35	82.00	61.26	45.68	34.02	25.28	18.77	13.91	10.30	7.62	5.63	4.20	2.67	<-
Montenegro	120.01	104.22	71.88	49.57	33.05	28.50	25.80	21.50	17.92	11.58	11.57	10.90	4.27	2.76	<-
Switzerland	29.04	23.53	20.92	16.81	13.68	9.70	7.79	7.03	6.06	4.78	4.55	4.21	3.89	3.37	<-
Poland	78.85	59.16	49.67	36.37	31.67	27.31	23.74	20.31	16.35	10.11	7.11	5.66	4.40	3.28	<-
Cyprus	64.95	51.10	40.15	31.47	24.69	19.30	15.09	11.79	9.18	7.15	5.59	4.35	4.19	3.54	<-
United Kingdom	28.24	24.01	22.88	18.83	16.99	13.83	10.55	8.98	6.68	5.84	5.30	4.83	4.06	3.76	<-
Taiwan	78.79	57.25	48.00	40.35	14.54	11.15	8.46	5.93	5.39	6.80	6.05	5.16	4.23	3.71	<-
New Zealand	26.56	23.95	20.64	17.90	15.96	13.60	11.82	10.49	7.36	6.20	5.40	4.95	4.37	3.80	<-
Croatia	95.51	70.78	49.70	34.94	25.38	21.89	18.24	13.52	10.21	7.11	6.52	5.75	4.26	4.00	<-
Mayotte (France)	142.60	109.06	82.07	61.24	45.68	34.01	25.28	18.76	13.91	10.30	7.62	5.63	4.20	4.20	<-
Lithuania	107.49	63.82	42.61	27.04	22.05	22.44	18.33	14.91	16.47	11.01	7.66	5.97	4.36	4.04	<-
Latvia	76.66	45.32	30.20	22.30	20.00	22.83	18.48	14.56	17.55	15.72	9.94	7.80	5.15	3.34	<-
Hungary	71.87	54.73	42.98	37.23	34.92	25.80	20.01	17.03	13.18	9.59	7.44	5.65	4.96	4.05	<-
Canada	37.82	32.00	25.97	20.88	16.27	12.23	8.99	7.40	6.24	5.36	5.27	5.11	4.65	4.51	<-
Cuba	80.59	69.72	59.37	49.61	38.38	22.35	17.62	13.00	9.94	7.98	6.13	5.34	4.80	4.49	<-
Slovakia	74.09	38.09	26.54	25.30	24.59	22.17	17.93	13.87	11.58	9.03	7.27	6.20	5.42	4.76	<-
Guadeloupe (France)	80.24	64.86	51.98	41.67	33.45	26.82	21.40	17.16	13.72	10.98	8.77	7.00	5.81	4.64	<-
Malta	68.24	40.20	32.24	27.19	20.57	15.17	12.40	9.92	8.51	6.91	5.71	5.59	5.49	4.97	<-
Serbia	117.49	103.12	87.94	68.59	50.82	40.15	34.76	22.37	17.17	16.09	9.52	7.07	6.07	4.90	<-
United States	30.16	27.18	25.14	22.33	17.81	14.07	11.43	10.27	8.67	7.44	6.99	6.78	5.96	5.82	<-
Puerto Rico (US)	63.35	51.38	44.76	33.27	25.29	19.66	17.19	13.79	11.59	10.95	8.01	7.19	6.37	5.45	<-
Antigua and Barbuda	77.56	63.94	49.78	41.66	39.23	36.78	34.33	28.40	20.62	15.13	11.48	8.95	6.79	5.20	<-
Martinique (France)	80.83	66.37	54.53	44.59	35.42	27.87	22.05	17.37	13.67	10.78	8.50	7.57	6.43	5.57	<-
United Arab Emirates	180.61	149.39	117.37	86.60	57.82	37.01	23.72	16.63	12.66	10.45	9.00	7.71	6.50	5.52	<-
Malaysia	101.52	79.99	59.70	46.31	38.38	29.45	21.13	15.67	12.34	9.91	7.62	6.99	6.42	5.90	<-
Jersey Channel Islands (UK)	32.49	28.30	26.97	24.88	23.39	21.31	17.96	16.03	13.65	10.33	8.78	7.58	6.75	6.12	<-
Bahrain	172.00	145.91	105.23	70.82	47.37	31.94	23.14	18.38	14.86	12.25	9.76	7.95	6.91	5.97	<-
Bosnia and Herzegovina	188.58	135.72	98.03	72.63	49.21	34.03	25.58	17.55	18.42	11.14	9.83	9.03	6.91	6.00	<-
French Polynesia (France)	129.51	99.83	89.02	79.60	71.50	58.64	34.73	19.66	18.05	10.17	9.40	8.78	6.91	6.66	<-
Qatar	105.82	87.04	68.72	50.76	43.71	33.46	26.63	20.75	15.24	11.87	9.80	8.30	7.32	6.29	<-
Bahamas	36.77	32.22	28.01	24.84	25.92	25.52	23.62	21.36	17.48	14.15	13.05	11.28	8.02	5.88	<-
Chile	122.54	117.98	107.44	88.10	66.63	44.06	24.59	17.97	14.00	11.08	8.33	7.74	7.20	6.72	<-
Russia	100.45	59.38	39.65	31.25	26.37	28.77	25.89	23.62	21.93	20.96	16.16	10.68	8.34	5.76	<-
Bulgaria	90.16	61.51	35.83	30.50	25.46	21.83	17.30	14.23	15.40	15.24	12.75	9.55	8.32	6.29	<-
Saudi Arabia	201.63	180.26	160.35	137.21	105.14	79.57	59.05	42.77	30.04	21.75	16.32	12.20	8.69	6.31	<-
Romania	90.75	80.41	53.93	51.01	39.25	30.85	25.67	25.54	22.98	20.28	16.94	11.96	8.35	6.68	<-
Kuwait	123.97	102.43	80.54	59.20	45.02	33.93	22.91	16.87	13.27	11.65	10.41	9.74	8.16	7.12	<-
Maldives	268.25	246.77	222.03	191.06	156.68	121.31	95.23	75.89	60.40	44.36	26.62	14.76	8.95	6.77	<-
Ukraine	78.52	46.49	30.96	23.49	20.97	22.91	19.91	17.76	17.05	16.62	14.80	12.64	8.75	7.20	<-
Sri Lanka	89.03	73.52	61.44	52.94	44.40	35.78	29.20	24.24	19.99	16.20	11.79	10.17	8.78	7.57	<-
Costa Rica	103.26	92.57	82.05	69.65	56.18	35.10	22.64	17.36	14.56	12.37	10.89	10.02	9.33	7.32	<-
Brunei	108.44	101.34	64.41	43.90	33.31	22.50	13.09	10.94	10.54	9.88	9.71	9.26	8.78	7.92	<-
Oman	210.94	180.37	153.75	130.66	108.93	82.62	59.43	42.11	30.87	21.70	14.64	9.77	9.60	7.27	<-
U.S. Virgin Islands (US)	58.20	46.87	41.15	35.18	29.52	24.92	21.54	18.04	15.33	13.15	11.63	10.66	8.96	8.16	<-
Albania	144.77	124.70	98.87	76.89	57.95	46.84	43.20	37.85	30.74	26.33	21.15	16.78	9.21	8.03	<-
French Guiana (France)	102.69	88.65	72.81	50.77	45.24	42.28	31.79	25.18	20.71	16.89	13.19	10.55	9.12	8.70	<-
Thailand	127.16	108.70	92.47	77.54	62.73	50.85	41.55	33.40	26.07	20.89	16.70	13.40	10.08	7.75	<-
Uruguay	57.31	53.05	47.85	47.10	46.29	42.42	33.47	22.57	20.05	15.58	14.53	11.28	10.05	8.70	<-
Guam (US)	82.20	70.85	60.00	49.95	41.29	34.23	28.60	24.30	20.76	17.03	13.58	11.37	10.07	8.69	<-
Lebanon	68.53	59.60	52.93	47.21	41.70	38.02	34.94	30.41	25.12	18.84	13.81	10.59	9.60	9.42	<-
Curaçao (Netherlands)	66.27	49.57	40.95	34.10	27.21	21.55	17.75	16.84	14.78	15.21	14.67	12.98	10.27	9.05	<-
North Macedonia	136.29	112.57	94.81	82.04	68.72	62.23	51.52	40.04	26.54	18.43	12.94	10.75	8.93	10.69	<-
Turkey	217.18	199.45	178.24	159.42	144.95	120.07	94.93	73.05	56.19	36.99	24.70	16.37	11.84	8.90	<-
Barbados	121.51	79.26	54.79	42.86	33.96	26.18	20.11	16.56	13.44	12.32	12.96	12.58	11.46	10.04	<-
Kazakhstan	110.24	101.67	93.25	85.05	76.71	68.59	60.21	51.98	50.90	43.51	32.01	23.86	14.12	7.67	<-
China	128.88	131.05	135.04	93.82	71.95	55.00	44.64	42.27	41.27	35.06	27.08	18.11	12.28	9.89	<-
Argentina	63.89	58.78	59.72	57.36	48.09	39.04	32.19	27.11	23.23	19.73	16.75	14.21	12.06	10.23	<-
Georgia (country)	79.86	72.89	65.84	58.93	51.93	49.29	46.60	43.97	45.00	34.91	26.52	18.19	12.92	9.37	<-
Mauritius	102.97	73.89	60.57	67.27	60.77	37.69	25.98	23.12	18.42	19.70	13.35	13.21	11.96	11.22	<-
Seychelles	80.91	76.09	69.77	60.36	47.07	32.16	20.95	15.84	13.26	11.90	11.86	12.15	12.37	10.87	<-
Libya	253.75	228.98	165.97	121.28	89.90	67.09	50.99	41.18	32.91	26.47	21.46	17.58	12.96	10.53	<-
Armenia	82.72	78.12	72.85	68.04	62.94	57.97	52.96	47.94	44.10	34.87	27.05	20.99	13.23	10.78	<-
New Caledonia (France)	116.57	96.29	79.45	65.46	53.74	44.14	35.85	29.27	24.28	20.54	17.29	15.10	13.01	11.51	<-
Moldova	81.14	68.94	58.96	49.00	45.96	45.91	35.50	31.23	28.99	24.46	18.82	15.59	14.17	12.37	<-
Jamaica	82.66	67.29	55.66	47.48	40.79	35.28	31.03	27.29	23.72	20.46	18.03	16.70	14.94	11.78	<-
Peru	158.53	148.15	132.95	120.94	103.76	94.94	80.23	66.57	50.13	36.18	24.92	18.13	14.09	12.79	<-
Colombia	116.60	99.97	85.75	74.67	63.20	49.81	37.87	30.66	26.42	22.46	19.51	16.95	14.44	12.64	<-
Tunisia	232.24	217.90	195.45	173.27	139.82	97.26	65.84	48.76	35.21	28.67	22.99	18.01	14.56	12.68	<-
Tonga	80.03	68.96	58.69	45.53	34.09	27.06	22.89	20.29	17.28	15.56	14.38	14.38	14.74	12.54	<-
Belize	100.17	88.48	78.18	68.52	59.54	50.49	39.88	35.18	29.71	23.01	20.15	17.30	14.98	12.81	<-
Iran	220.32	197.56	174.83	153.62	123.75	95.47	71.28	49.80	39.35	31.87	24.82	19.13	15.16	12.82	<-
Aruba (Netherlands)	68.97	51.78	42.50	35.73	29.23	24.51	20.49	19.43	19.02	18.29	17.77	16.18	14.78	13.61	<-
Saint Lucia	118.00	101.67	80.81	61.90	46.63	29.67	22.80	19.69	17.75	16.17	15.69	16.26	16.00	12.49	<-
Samoa	93.75	85.44	77.53	69.06	59.49	47.08	35.04	27.22	23.17	19.58	17.00	16.64	15.09	13.45	<-
Grenada	76.72	67.40	56.85	46.54	37.92	29.46	21.50	19.10	16.45	14.01	12.66	12.34	13.67	14.99	<-
Mexico	120.97	101.32	87.91	79.33	68.88	56.77	46.99	39.45	33.08	24.98	20.12	17.14	15.16	13.51	<-
Ecuador	138.14	128.34	115.03	102.29	89.77	77.36	62.74	50.93	40.73	31.17	23.64	19.13	15.07	13.60	<-
Brazil	136.25	123.71	114.69	99.22	87.68	79.46	66.60	50.48	40.75	32.34	26.16	19.34	14.79	12.52	<-
Panama	85.64	73.66	61.85	51.79	43.05	36.08	34.13	29.81	26.25	23.28	20.62	17.78	16.00	13.73	<-
Jordan	146.59	119.59	95.47	77.39	65.70	54.01	42.71	33.97	29.05	25.57	22.39	19.68	17.06	14.63	<-
Saint Vincent and the Grenadines	115.56	103.27	87.87	72.53	60.84	49.55	33.83	23.00	19.28	19.35	19.64	19.48	17.36	14.65	<-
El Salvador	143.05	134.78	121.54	110.45	101.49	92.65	79.82	60.51	41.10	29.10	23.59	21.55	17.71	14.57	<-
North Korea	121.32	82.65	79.50	58.01	45.23	36.31	31.11	27.39	42.11	57.81	28.50	27.27	18.54	13.90	<-
Syria	141.55	123.05	107.70	90.14	70.97	55.31	42.91	33.46	26.26	21.25	17.74	14.96	17.87	15.54	<-
Honduras	169.30	153.91	135.45	118.90	103.59	80.95	64.93	52.92	43.00	35.02	28.36	23.32	18.39	15.04	<-
Egypt	248.64	204.61	184.06	170.17	165.43	133.16	106.86	74.29	59.55	36.68	29.35	23.47	18.92	15.61	<-
Nicaragua	172.41	150.54	131.30	113.68	97.80	90.08	79.73	64.94	47.95	33.55	26.43	23.08	17.83	16.78	<-
Vietnam	103.38	81.50	66.65	56.81	54.22	45.61	41.16	37.14	33.51	27.79	23.58	18.97	17.90	16.71	<-
Kyrgyzstan	138.69	130.37	119.62	109.9	99.89	89.91	79.92	69.97	59.83	48.24	37.18	30.23	19.54	15.51	<-
Solomon Islands	171.30	139.91	112.45	87.51	64.08	47.52	38.08	33.06	29.39	26.35	24.58	22.97	20.16	15.46	<-
Palestinian territories	140.84	130.01	117.07	99.18	82.63	67.55	52.08	40.70	32.68	27.34	23.72	21.05	19.30	17.46	<-
Cape Verde	130.98	127.61	124.19	109.30	95.80	70.46	62.07	53.98	46.52	36.86	24.46	22.92	20.58	16.89	<-
Suriname	77.43	67.39	56.02	54.20	52.18	50.19	48.35	43.61	38.28	32.83	27.97	23.72	20.26	17.49	<-
Paraguay	73.45	69.71	62.28	58.55	57.11	52.59	46.57	39.58	34.06	30.07	27.06	24.05	20.78	19.02	<-
Fiji	86.99	65.98	53.62	46.83	43.96	39.37	31.82	26.17	22.03	19.66	18.80	19.58	19.95	20.32	<-
Venezuela	100.62	84.36	69.46	58.33	46.07	38.73	32.26	27.26	23.09	20.43	17.16	14.79	15.01	25.70	<-
Mongolia	182.70	164.50	134.32	118.52	106.38	104.40	102.22	91.65	67.51	53.98	40.77	30.51	22.79	18.09	<-
Philippines	85.13	71.82	62.39	57.03	54.64	53.99	51.52	45.21	36.46	31.10	27.90	25.46	23.72	19.66	<-
Indonesia	183.96	159.28	139.24	121.48	104.62	90.76	79.10	67.63	55.94	45.48	37.25	30.39	25.03	18.91	<-
Morocco	151.31	142.75	132.88	122.64	113.07	101.97	83.82	66.54	52.99	44.02	36.61	26.60	24.17	19.86	<-
Algeria	163.01	153.45	142.82	132.29	122.19	105.46	75.35	55.36	43.04	37.83	33.62	29.40	24.94	21.24	<-
Vanuatu	121.97	110.82	99.06	84.40	70.51	58.41	44.84	33.10	27.00	24.76	23.71	24.03	24.30	22.38	<-
Guatemala	168.39	154.50	140.51	126.71	111.86	96.48	81.63	68.10	55.31	44.93	37.25	31.26	26.94	20.74	<-
Trinidad and Tobago	69.64	60.23	51.54	45.70	41.55	37.01	32.48	29.56	28.44	28.55	28.81	28.47	26.09	21.98	<-
Uzbekistan	124.37	114.78	104.56	94.32	84.25	77.78	71.41	64.94	59.36	54.78	49.40	40.73	27.68	20.83	<-
Azerbaijan	119.87	114.87	110.00	104.95	99.93	94.97	89.95	84.99	81.73	64.44	54.17	40.70	31.39	20.83	<-
Iraq	225.39	169.56	128.60	91.33	72.71	56.96	50.56	44.44	38.02	37.45	34.49	31.73	28.49	24.11	<-
Dominican Republic	153.07	138.60	123.83	108.87	95.84	85.91	75.13	62.84	49.51	41.27	34.91	29.54	27.49	25.85	<-
Cambodia	142.35	135.43	134.09	131.78	138.52	319.24	152.33	86.04	85.94	86.30	65.80	44.81	29.97	23.72	<-
Micronesia	95.48	85.67	75.60	65.40	56.38	47.73	44.80	44.28	42.84	42.83	39.81	34.95	30.28	23.49	<-
Bhutan	246.27	225.40	202.04	175.88	151.06	130.91	109.81	91.96	75.59	61.71	51.91	39.49	30.47	24.06	<-
Guyana	72.06	66.78	61.97	57.33	55.90	54.41	52.47	49.84	44.78	40.51	35.29	31.95	31.66	26.76	<-
Sao Tome and Principe	138.17	125.97	112.00	100.38	87.02	74.40	70.78	77.21	79.37	71.35	56.13	42.05	32.08	26.42	<-
Bangladesh	210.90	182.07	161.01	149.68	167.84	138.48	124.31	106.97	88.26	70.30	55.48	43.32	33.15	26.85	<-
South Africa	134.21	121.24	112.49	103.08	88.79	70.64	55.82	45.52	41.23	47.25	53.93	48.08	32.94	27.24	<-
Nepal	224.16	220.54	208.04	186.82	167.03	148.88	129.43	108.72	87.00	68.42	53.66	42.62	33.78	27.93	<-
Bolivia	177.71	170.29	161.77	151.91	140.73	128.19	114.32	99.24	83.14	66.28	51.97	42.12	32.40	29.71	<-
Western Sahara (disputed)	216.58	200.92	186.87	173.17	159.66	133.75	109.86	87.87	75.86	64.39	52.92	43.04	34.13	28.78	<-
Tajikistan	140.82	134.46	125.25	117.22	106.21	96.63	93.28	80.17	84.22	78.59	57.25	39.00	34.05	29.26	<-
Botswana	127.89	112.48	98.66	85.44	71.45	56.40	43.51	36.32	41.82	56.43	57.04	44.15	35.47	30.15	<-
Madagascar	182.66	168.56	156.41	144.63	133.81	122.39	109.05	107.81	100.05	77.73	57.97	45.49	36.77	29.04	<-
Rwanda	150.34	145.18	140.03	136.07	134.60	130.03	113.84	119.73	196.26	122.28	94.28	62.68	39.41	29.18	<-
Senegal	127.55	122.88	117.43	112.79	108.01	97.32	84.93	75.25	71.58	68.24	61.13	47.48	38.27	32.75	<-
India	180.95	166.50	154.61	145.81	135.84	120.80	105.66	93.25	82.11	71.25	59.95	49.46	39.08	32.00	<-
Namibia	143.99	130.78	115.33	100.71	87.80	75.90	68.72	55.06	49.78	50.73	51.13	43.46	38.56	33.38	<-
Congo, Republic of	134.20	121.37	108.06	96.58	85.91	76.27	67.06	60.12	63.97	74.47	72.23	52.48	41.42	35.29	<-
Gabon	159.91	153.51	148.70	134.24	117.90	100.50	83.08	67.19	63.53	61.59	59.72	49.93	41.91	35.28	<-
Kenya	142.46	133.76	120.93	109.43	96.99	85.95	75.69	73.54	74.03	70.97	62.76	51.12	41.56	36.34	<-
Eritrea	199.33	181.27	159.98	147.87	139.99	132.04	121.15	111.58	94.43	71.12	59.38	51.65	45.01	34.72	<-
Ghana	147.44	133.48	122.04	113.26	106.45	99.16	92.66	82.73	72.50	66.90	60.90	53.72	44.83	35.63	<-
Myanmar	213.03	173.98	155.72	123.43	111.35	100.30	90.32	81.15	72.68	65.13	57.82	51.98	43.66	38.40	<-
East Timor	264.27	241.45	220.56	201.00	183.16	253.22	183.22	141.32	118.50	89.79	69.02	53.27	44.89	37.34	<-
Ethiopia	199.25	181.19	159.92	147.81	140.46	136.49	139.96	125.78	114.00	96.61	77.90	59.82	45.79	37.00	<-
Laos	175.86	166.84	156.43	147.28	138.00	130.25	121.88	108.36	97.80	83.16	69.95	57.53	46.97	38.76	<-
Yemen	287.97	281.05	270.84	239.85	198.47	159.02	121.01	96.13	83.54	74.88	61.56	48.64	43.28	43.23	<-
Tanzania	148.42	142.37	138.11	132.18	124.56	116.50	112.99	109.30	105.26	92.23	70.96	55.48	46.86	41.21	<-
Djibouti	154.16	143.27	131.20	120.16	103.95	96.34	87.38	81.20	76.10	71.75	68.10	63.42	55.67	33.36	<-
Zimbabwe	113.74	103.34	91.39	79.90	75.50	74.73	65.19	54.91	61.84	69.98	65.01	62.69	51.22	38.74	<-
Turkmenistan	149.99	139.85	130.21	120.28	110.48	100.63	90.84	80.89	75.44	67.55	61.98	54.14	46.88	43.28	<-
Papua New Guinea	158.09	141.47	124.15	108.07	93.84	82.44	74.12	68.35	63.89	60.62	58.19	54.48	48.31	41.95	<-
Sudan	134.53	121.43	111.18	102.07	93.29	89.04	86.98	84.07	79.91	70.10	61.79	53.18	47.83	42.86	<-
Kiribati	146.77	133.88	121.45	105.19	92.93	88.30	86.11	77.95	66.22	58.40	52.29	51.44	47.93	42.98	<-
Eswatini	144.80	137.82	130.21	121.40	107.52	89.05	68.91	52.52	54.10	76.42	86.32	74.23	51.61	41.36	<-
Malawi	178.42	176.26	172.58	169.48	162.30	155.29	147.87	141.14	127.16	106.24	86.94	68.43	52.55	41.33	<-
Gambia	156.28	149.91	144.11	127.40	113.40	100.93	89.94	81.55	76.06	67.08	59.36	52.36	49.82	44.83	<-
Burundi	166.26	157.42	148.56	140.26	136.43	131.53	117.01	103.55	110.55	103.05	87.54	69.99	52.33	42.44	<-
Zambia	137.92	128.94	120.63	116.21	107.16	100.41	104.64	115.96	116.66	108.83	88.40	64.72	53.31	45.61	<-
Niger	160.86	160.63	158.14	155.60	150.64	138.69	132.92	138.78	129.70	102.62	85.23	67.59	55.90	46.31	<-
Uganda	150.34	141.42	131.47	120.49	116.52	115.92	116.98	116.10	105.28	93.51	79.51	70.73	58.96	46.15	<-
Togo	185.96	164.05	144.83	127.94	112.79	100.61	92.24	87.12	83.39	80.18	77.31	64.16	55.67	49.68	<-
Comoros	192.39	179.71	166.34	153.43	139.09	126.56	108.88	93.38	80.95	74.00	72.53	66.63	58.06	53.10	<-
Afghanistan	275.87	253.65	230.19	211.07	191.64	171.52	150.04	129.08	110.33	96.17	84.65	72.19	60.10	51.71	<-
Mauritania	147.77	137.38	121.76	108.91	103.05	96.63	86.78	75.63	70.32	69.71	69.20	65.57	58.86	53.44	<-
Liberia	165.36	164.56	163.25	156.75	149.51	144.21	139.48	148.87	156.09	135.94	100.28	72.88	60.13	54.06	<-
Haiti	221.29	194.79	181.34	166.80	148.43	131.73	120.12	105.22	92.37	79.35	68.94	63.82	60.96	54.30	<-
Mozambique	164.47	158.02	152.04	152.89	153.02	152.11	149.60	144.53	138.38	121.33	98.79	78.68	62.78	53.91	<-
Guinea	206.75	199.80	194.93	192.11	185.32	171.27	156.39	142.31	128.15	111.65	95.16	77.65	65.70	51.64	<-
Burkina Faso	228.11	208.84	192.10	172.00	153.43	132.94	119.24	109.67	103.97	99.47	89.98	77.53	64.74	54.21	<-
Guinea-Bissau	162.52	159.74	156.78	151.31	146.46	140.57	134.25	130.18	124.88	114.74	103.87	85.25	68.10	57.12	<-
Lesotho	128.02	118.45	114.77	113.80	105.36	90.89	74.22	63.55	62.83	73.10	78.96	74.94	65.37	62.25	<-
Côte d'Ivoire	189.17	177.85	161.78	144.40	129.45	115.11	105.42	101.55	100.42	99.26	87.92	77.20	67.46	60.42	<-
Benin	207.82	192.49	175.99	162.83	150.71	135.25	123.60	113.52	102.18	93.32	84.03	74.51	67.66	61.15	<-
Pakistan	250.03	203.79	171.64	150.01	136.71	127.31	118.96	109.96	101.04	91.75	82.92	75.64	68.10	61.33	<-
South Sudan	248.10	225.34	209.13	193.47	180.94	168.71	165.56	149.64	129.76	113.78	101.32	78.57	65.81	64.36	<-
Cameroon	154.96	148.85	141.18	133.43	123.45	112.40	103.88	99.82	102.91	105.85	92.17	80.45	70.66	61.18	<-
Nigeria	200.29	185.98	172.57	159.28	147.07	134.06	125.18	125.88	125.86	118.50	103.96	89.33	74.97	62.14	<-
Congo, Democratic Republic of	166.33	157.45	151.02	143.35	133.60	129.04	121.40	115.94	109.65	112.82	99.47	83.83	73.15	64.92	<-
Angola	192.80	187.54	180.65	172.00	162.33	154.58	148.74	145.39	145.06	142.14	128.76	104.21	78.25	61.46	<-
Equatorial Guinea	167.05	162.79	158.25	153.59	148.56	143.43	130.94	124.63	116.01	105.70	95.42	84.63	73.79	66.13	<-
Mali	241.92	223.57	206.89	191.50	176.25	162.69	150.64	138.98	126.95	121.16	106.53	89.06	78.47	65.80	<-
Somalia	199.81	185.66	172.91	160.35	147.25	136.58	127.62	123.09	129.41	105.01	96.96	89.76	79.44	69.31	<-
Chad	186.05	176.51	168.50	159.37	146.10	137.63	130.02	123.17	119.04	114.13	108.34	97.53	84.06	74.50	<-
Central African Republic	169.91	164.19	158.11	149.81	136.90	122.55	112.92	111.00	111.03	109.79	105.11	99.65	90.29	81.90	<-
Sierra Leone	237.16	225.27	216.34	203.79	190.25	179.68	171.05	165.76	162.80	157.07	141.88	122.09	97.13	80.77	<-
World	139.57	127.72	120.35	104.13	93.99	84.90	75.28	66.87	62.91	56.87	49.22	40.98	33.91	29.26	

== See also ==
- List of countries by maternal mortality ratio
