= Health in Antigua and Barbuda =

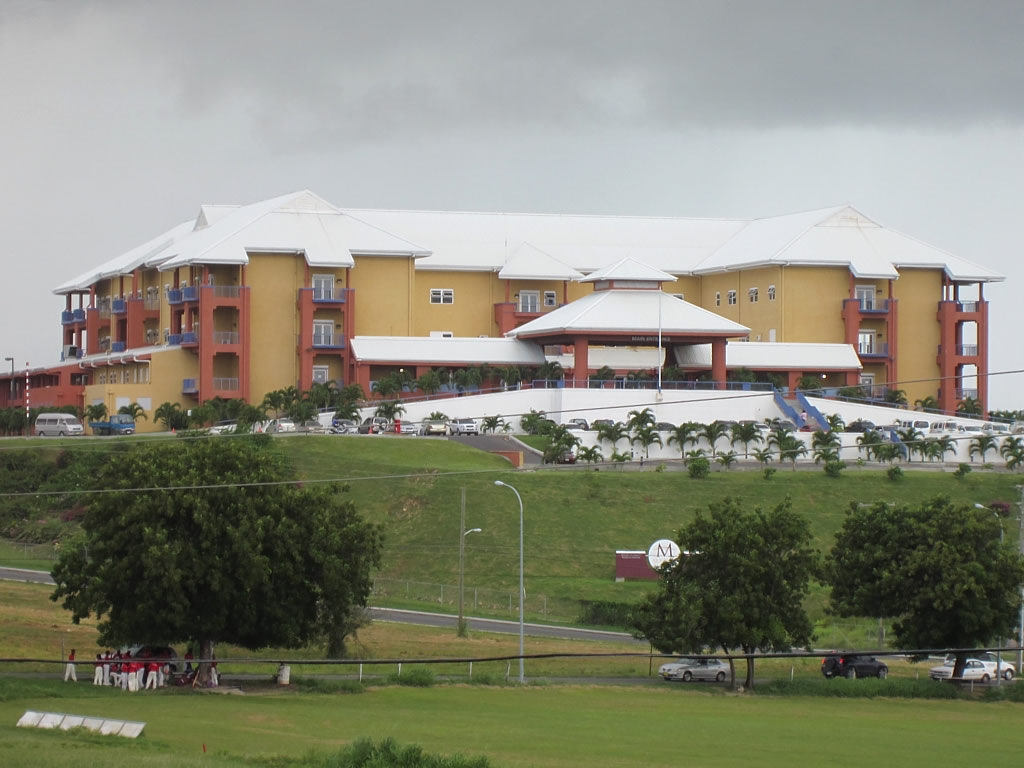
Mount St. John's Medical Centre, the main hospital in the country

According to the World Health Organization, Antigua and Barbuda had an average life expectancy at birth of 77.6 years in 2020. Antigua and Barbuda maintains a very high human development index as of 2022. Generally, women are more likely than men to have some kind of disability. Barbudans are more likely than Antiguans to have a disability of some kind. The country's health policy is overseen by the Ministry of Health, Wellness, Social Transformation and the Environment.

== Chronic conditions ==
As of 2011, 10.57% of Antiguans and Barbudans reported having some kind of disability or chronic condition. Only 2.46% of Antiguans and Barbudans had a chronic condition that had a significant impact on their daily lives. Most people with chronic conditions in Antigua and Barbuda are between eighteen and sixty-four, but the highest proportion of people with chronic conditions are the elderly. As the population ages, they are more likely to acquire some sort of chronic condition. The most common chronic conditions include food hypertension, allergies, asthma, and diabetes, with the last three each hovering at about six per cent of the population.

== Children's health ==
While children in Antigua and Barbuda are generally healthy, diseases like sickle cell remain a significant issue. Sickle cell is rare in all parts of the country, but is most common in Saint Philip and in St. John's. Food allergies are also common, in children slightly more than the national average.

== See also ==
- Disability in Antigua and Barbuda
