= List of hospitals in Greenland =

List of hospitals in Greenland include the following:

- National Hospital, Queen Ingrid's Hospital, Nuuk, 130 beds
- Aasiaat Regional Hospital, Aasiaat
- Ilulissat Regional Hospital, Ilulissat
- Sisimiut Regional Hospital, Sisimiut
- Qaqortoq Regional Hospital, Qaqortoq
- Tasiilaq Hospital, Tasiilaq

== See also ==
- Health in Greenland
