= Obesity in Austria =

Obesity in Austria has been increasingly cited as a major health issue in recent years. Forty per cent of Austrians between 18 and 65 are considered overweight while eleven per cent of those overweight meet the definition of obesity. Forbes.com ranks Austria as the 52nd fattest country in the World with a rate of 57.1%. Approximately 900,000 people are considered obese.

== Causes ==
A lack of exercise is a cause of obesity. A study showed that children only got 30 minutes of exercise instead of the hour that is required. Proper skeletal development, muscle building, heart and circulation are among the benefits of exercising during childhood.

== Effects ==
Several studies have shown that obese men tend to have a lower sperm count, fewer rapidly mobile sperm and fewer progressively motile sperm compared to normal-weight men.

== Forbes 2007 ranking ==
The following list reflects the percentage of overweight adults aged 15 and over. These are individuals who have individual body mass indexes, which measures weight relative to height, greater than or equal to 25

Ranking	Country	Percentage
47	Vanuatu	59.6
48	Finland	58.7
49	Jamaica	57.4
50	Israel	57.3
51	Saint Lucia	57.3
52	Austria	57.1
53	Azerbaijan	57.1
54	Turkey	56.8
55	Tuvalu	56.6
56	Dominican Republic	56.5
57	Slovakia	56.3

== See also ==
- Health in Austria
- Epidemiology of obesity
