= Healthcare on the Isle of Man =

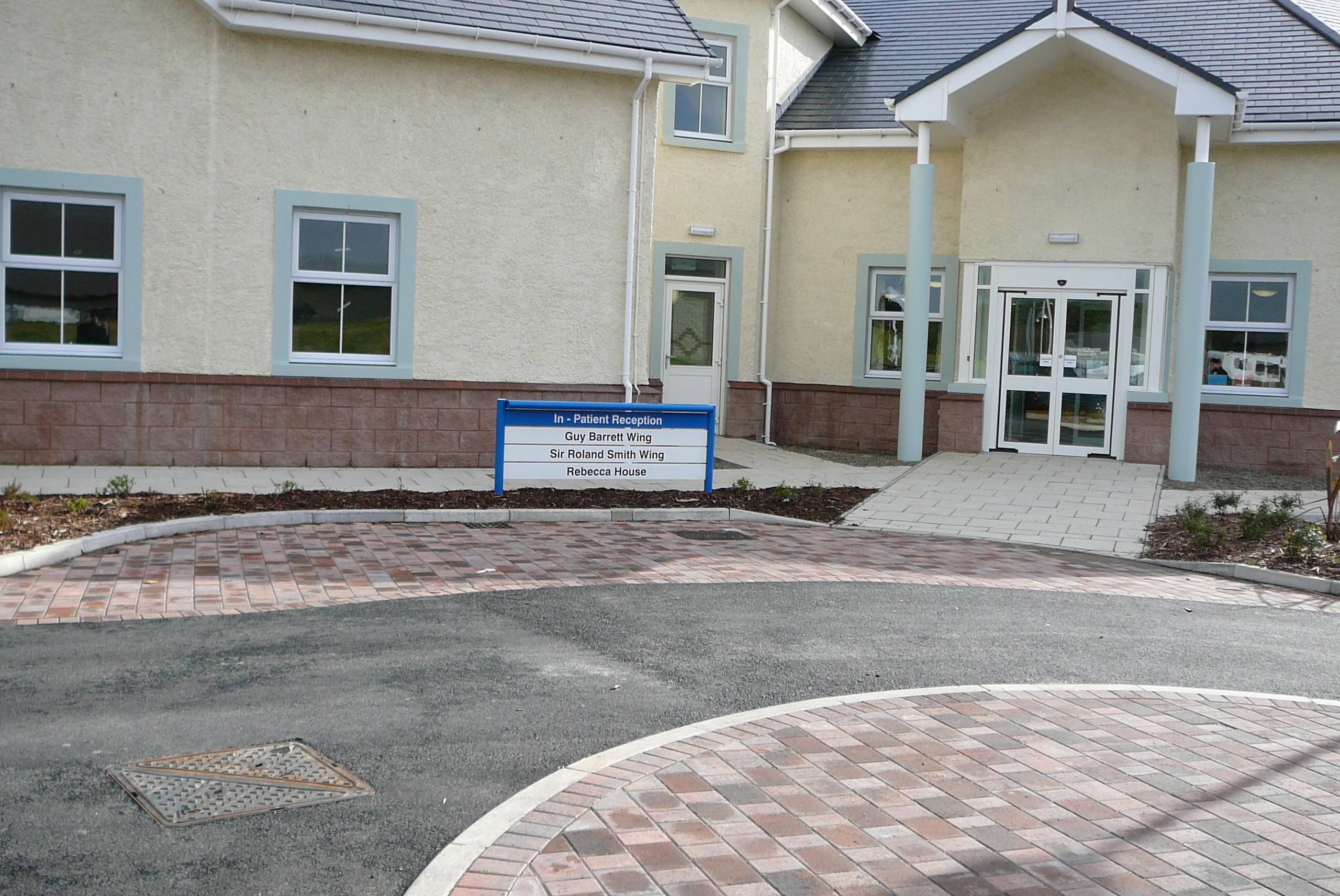
The patient entrance at a Manx hospice care facility in 2007

Health and social care on the Isle of Man is the responsibility of the Department of Health and Social Care. Healthcare in Isle of Man is free for residents and visitors from the UK, and there is a reciprocal health agreement with the UK. For several years, it has required a supplementary vote to balance its budget at the end of each year. The Reciprocal Health Agreement only covers three months from the point of arrival in the UK.

== Organisation ==
Sir Jonathan Michael conducted a review of arrangements for health and social care services on the Isle of Man which was published in May 2019. He recommended that they should be delivered "at arm's length" from the government and that arrangements for clinical support from the NHS in England should be improved. The chief executive of the Department of Health and Social Care and his deputy resigned.

== Funding ==
In 2013, about £178.4 million was spent on healthcare. £138 million came from the Manx government and about £40 million from income National Insurance contributions, prescription charges and private patient fees. About £80 million was spent on Noble's hospital. In March 2018, Sir Jonathan Michael was asked to conduct a review of the service because of concern that current funding levels are "unsustainable". The Council of Ministers estimated that funding would have to be increased by 23% – an additional £60 million by 2022/23.

== Primary care ==
The fourteen general practices have a list system. Patients have to register with a GP. Temporary residents from the UK can use the service without charge. The average number of patients per GP has been increasing; it was 1,851 in 2011 and had increased to 2,360 in 2023. A digital facility for patients to make GP appointments and view their own health information online was launched in September 2017. The Manx Emergency Doctor Service is available when the practices are closed, from 6 pm to 8 am and at weekends and bank holidays.

Dentistry services are available on a similar basis to those in the UK, with charging on a banded basis and exemptions for children, students, pensioners, pregnant women and people in receipt of Income Support, Income Based Job Seekers Allowance or Employed Persons Allowance, war disablement pensioners and blind people.

Annual eye tests are provided free to Isle of Man residents. NHS vouchers are available towards the cost of spectacles.

Manx prescription charges have been set at £3.85 per item since September 2010, less than half the charge in England. People get free prescriptions who have chronic conditions, as well as people who are: under 16 years old, under 19 years old and in school full-time, pregnant, on public assistance, prisoners, on a pension and under 75 years old, or over 75 years old.

In April 2018, there was an announcement that NHS dentists on the island were at full capacity and that it could take years for new patients to be registered.

== Secondary care ==
There are two hospitals on the island, the main one being Noble’s Hospital, with 314 beds, giving about four beds per 1,000 residents, around the European average, but considerably higher than in the UK. Tertiary services are provided by the English NHS. The much smaller Ramsey Cottage Hospital has 31 beds and is situated in the town of Ramsey, on the north of the island.

The Isle of Man Ambulance Service is based at Cronk Coar on the Noble's Hospital site. It has nine accident and emergency vehicles, four patient transport vehicles and rapid response vehicles.

Since 24 May 2019, it is lawful to have an abortion during the first 14 weeks of pregnancy at will, then until the 24th week, so long as criteria specified by the act are met, and then onwards if there is a serious risk of grave injury or death. Abortion is governed by the Abortion Reform Act 2019.

== History ==
Before 1948, there was a Mental Hospital Board which was responsible for Ballamona Hospital under the Poor Relief Acts and three voluntary hospitals: Ramsey Cottage Hospital, Noble’s Hospital and the Jane Crookall Maternity Home on the island. Each had its own management committee, and there was a Hospitals Contributory Scheme. White Hoe Hospital was run by the Corporation of Douglas. There were proposals, by the Corrin Trustees who had collected funds, to establish a hospital in Peel but they were halted by the outbreak of war. Domiciliary services were provided by district nurses, employed by the twelve district nursing associations. There were also two infant welfare health visitors and seven infant welfare clinics.

The Isle of Man Medical Society had begun preparing for the establishment of the NHS in 1946 and asking the Manx government to establish a process. The two existing government bodies mostly closely involved were the Local Government Board and the Health Insurance and Pensions Board – which became the Board of Social Services in 1947 – submitted a report in April 1947.

The free health service started on the island on 5 July 1948, just as in the United Kingdom, but without any legislation. 5 July on the island is, coincidentally, Tynwald day, a public holiday. It was clear that the board would have to collect National Health Insurance contributions from that date to ensure reciprocity with the United Kingdom.

The Mental Hospital Board was renamed the Health Services Board under the Health Services Board Act which was passed on 15 June 1948 and took on responsibility for the Cronk Ruagh Sanatorium and White Hoe Isolation Hospital. The voluntary hospital management committees continued but were now overseen by and responsible to politicians – something they did not welcome. One-third of their members were now appointed by the board, to be responsible to the board, and their accounts and activities were subject to monthly scrutiny. They were assimilated in 1963.

The Isle of Man Health Services Act was not passed until 10 August 1948. It was agreed that the term "people of the Isle of Man" could and should be interpreted as including anybody physically present on the island at the time so that visitors – mostly from the UK – would be covered. In return, the English NHS agreed that Manx patients could be sent, as necessary, for free treatment in English hospitals, and for other treatment not available on the Island.

32 general practitioners, 40 chemists, 16 dentists and 10 opticians joined the service at its inception. There were 28 specialist hospital doctors: 9 full-time, 12 part-time, and 7 visiting from England. For the first nine months of operation to 31 March 1949 the costs came to £197,200. The estimate for the first full year to 31 March 1950, was £454,668. By 1954 the board was under pressure to reduce its expenditure by 20%. The board responded by insisting that this would require reductions in the service which would have to be determined by the government. The National Health Service Act 1950 widened the board's powers to introduce charges, and in November 1950 a charge of 6d. per prescription form was introduced. This caused all but six of the chemists to withdraw their services for a fortnight. In December 1950 the board introduced a range of exemptions from charges. Charges for dental treatment were introduced in 1950 and, in 1952, charges for spectacles at 10/- a lens, and the whole cost of an approved frame.

There was considerable administrative support from the English NHS. The Manchester Prescription Pricing Bureau dealt with the invoicing of prescribed medicine. A prescribing committee was established of whose six members four were doctors and one a chemist. Charges for prescriptions were increased in April 1953 to 1/- per form.

In 1954, the board took responsibility for the Welfare Food Scheme. Orange juice, cod liver oil, and vitamin tablets were distributed through the ten infant welfare clinics. They were free to all children under five, and to expectant and nursing mothers in necessitous circumstances. In the year to March 1956 25,884 bottles of orange juice, 4,776 bottles of cod liver oil, and 594 packets of vitamin tablets were distributed. It also ran the Cheap Milk Scheme. From 1951 this was subject to a means test. In 1955/6, this was a household income not exceeding £5 a week, with the addition of 6 shillings for each dependent member. There were 176 beneficiaries, including six nursing or expectant mothers. A Home Help Scheme was also established and by 1959 there were 25 Home Helps.

The School Dental Service provided free treatment for children of school age, and they were originally not eligible for free treatment from other dentists except in an emergency.

The Isle of Man looks to be the first jurisdiction in the British Islands to allow assisted dying to give terminally ill people choice and protection at the end of life, after passing the law in 2023.

== See also ==
- Health in the Isle of Man
