= Healthcare in Belarus =

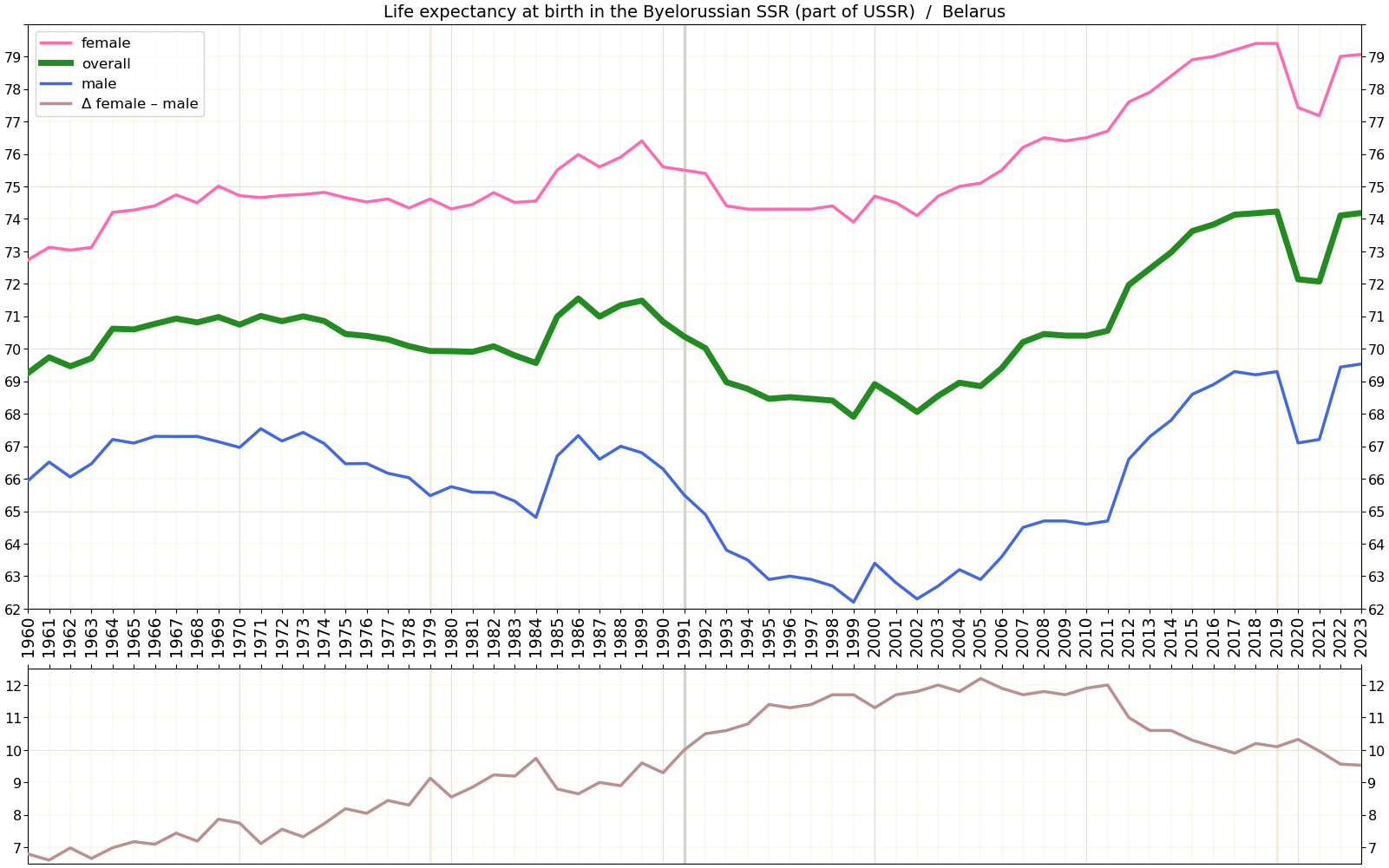
Life expectancy development in Belarus by gender

Healthcare in Belarus is supervised by the Ministry of Health and funded by general taxation through the National Health Service. Belarusian healthcare is inexpensive and easily available, although specialized care is rare.

The country has maintained the system of privileged medical service for senior government officials who are entitled to use the hospital of the Department of Presidential Affairs. It is also available to other patients, but they have to pay.

There is a network of day care clinics in the cities and mobile clinics in rural areas. There is a small private medicine sector, mostly dentistry. Some of the services provided by the state attract a charge.

== Quality of care ==
Quality healthcare in Belarus is concentrated around urban areas, where purchasing powers are higher, leading to an inequality of health services in the rural areas.

In 1994, there were 127 hospital beds and forty-two doctors per 10,000 inhabitants. The country had 131,000 hospital beds at 868 hospitals.

According to Numbeo global healthcare index, Belarus was ranked 90th of 93 countries in 2021 (the country was 59th in 2020).

== See also ==
- Health in Belarus
