= Health in Greenland =

The healthcare system in Greenland is a publicly financed governmental responsibility managed by the Agency for Health and Prevention. Greenland took over responsibility for the health care system from Denmark in 1992.

== Healthcare ==
In 2006, health care cost 938 million Danish kronor corresponding to 2,219 euros per head, almost entirely publicly financed. Health care is more than 18 percent of government expenditure. About 28 percent is for Queen Ingrid's Hospital and 12 percent of the budget for specialist treatments outside Greenland, including serious criminal offenders in specialized psychiatric wards. Six percent of the total budget goes on transport for patients with acute injuries or illnesses. Each district has a small hospital and there are health clinics in every village. Most elective surgery is performed at Queen Ingrid's Hospital. It is difficult to recruit clinical staff especially for more remote areas.

There are no private healthcare services, but there is private dental care, physiotherapy, psychotherapy and treatment for alcohol and drug abuse in Nuuk.

== See also ==
- List of hospitals in Greenland
