= Health in San Marino =

San Marino has a life expectancy among the longest in the world.

== CIA World Factbook demographic statistics ==
Infant mortality rate in San Marino was 6.33 deaths/1,000 live births (2000 est.)

Life expectancy at birth in 2000 was estimated:
total population: 81.14 years
male: 77.57 years
female: 85.02 years (2000 est.)

The total fertility rate was 1.5 children born per woman (2011 est.)
