= Health in Anguilla =

Health in Anguilla is managed by the Health Authority of Anguilla, an agency of the Government of Anguilla.

== Storm damage ==
Health facilities were devastated in 2017 as a result of Hurricane Irma. Immediate medical support was provided by the Pan American Health Organization and Direct Relief. The British government and charitable donations have contributed towards the rebuilding program. Tim Foy says "The United Kingdom government is committed to the full rehabilitation of the Princess Alexandra Hospital".

== Healthcare ==
In November 2018 it established a charitable foundation, the Health Authority of Anguilla Foundation, which is to be registered in Delaware as a 501(c)(3) organization which will allow tax-free contributions from donors in the USA. This is intended to help close "the gap between the health needs and desires of the community and the capacity to meet these needs and desires".

People on the island often use health facilities on St. Maarten. Their access to the British NHS is limited. There are concerns about the effect of Brexit on access to medicine and medical treatment.

The Ministry of Health and Social Development employed Dr. Olufunmike Banks-Devonish as a Clinical Psychologist in November 2018, the first full-time clinical psychologist to be employed by the Anguilla Public Service.

== Water ==
Water supply is the responsibility of the Water Corporation of Anguilla, which entered into a 10 year contract with Seven Seas Water, a subsidiary of AquaVenture Holdings Limited in October 2018 for the supply of 500 thousand gallons per day, due to expand to 750 thousand gallons per day. Testing of water on the island is done by the St. Maarten Laboratory Services.
