= Health in Slovenia =

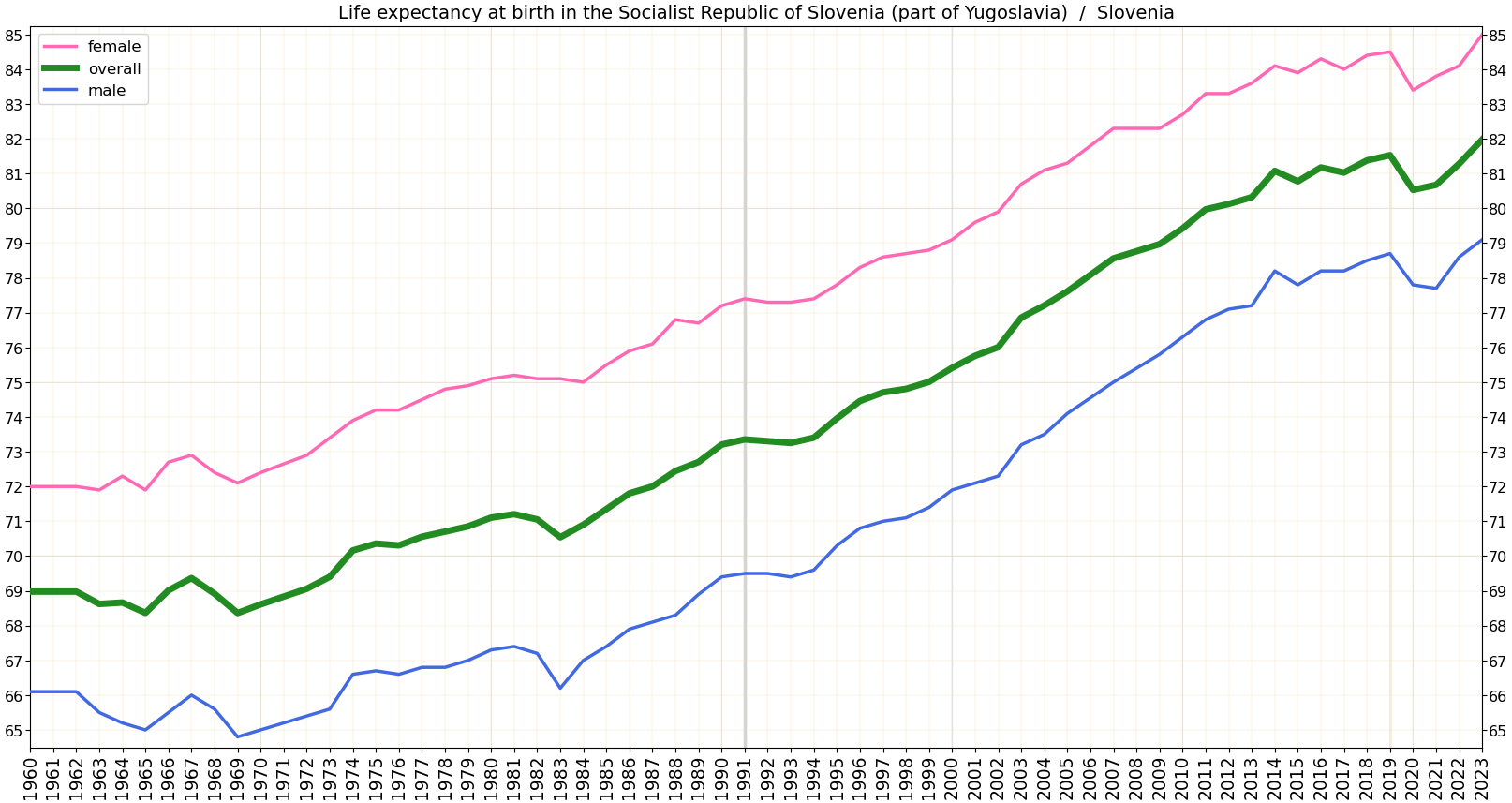
Life expectancy at birth in Slovenia

A new measure of expected human capital calculated for 195 countries from 1990 to 2016 and defined for each birth cohort as the expected years lived from age 20 to 64 years and adjusted for educational attainment, learning or education quality, and functional health status was published by The Lancet in September 2018. Slovenia had the twenty-fourth highest level of expected human capital with 23 health, education, and learning-adjusted expected years lived between age 20 and 64 years.

== Vaccination ==
According to a 2011 publication in CMAJ: Slovenia has one of the world's most aggressive and comprehensive vaccination programs. Its program is mandatory for nine designated diseases. Within the first three months of life, infants must be vaccinated for tuberculosis, tetanus, polio, pertussis, and Haemophilus influenza type B. Within 18 months, vaccines are required for measles, mumps and rubella, and finally, before a child starts school, the child must be vaccinated for hepatitis B. While a medical exemption request can be submitted to a committee, such an application for reasons of religion or conscience would not be acceptable. Failure to comply results in a fine and compliance rates top 95%, Kraigher says, adding that for nonmandatory vaccines, such as the one for human papilloma virus, coverage is below 50%.

Mandatory vaccination against measles was introduced in 1968 and since 1978, all children receive two doses of vaccine with a compliance rate of more than 95%. For TBE, the vaccination rate in 2007 was estimated to be 12.4% of the general population in 2007. For comparison, in neighboring Austria, 87% of the population is vaccinated against TBE.

== Obesity ==
It had the third highest rate of obesity in Europe in 2015. 27% of the adult population had a body mass index of 30 or more.

See also:

- Healthcare in Slovenia
