= Health in the Solomon Islands =

The Human Rights Measurement Initiative finds that the Solomon Islands is fulfilling 78.8% of what it should be fulfilling for the right to health based on its level of income. When looking at the right to health with respect to children, the Solomon Islands achieves 100.0% of what is expected based on its current income. In regards to the right to health amongst the adult population, the country achieves 97.6% of what is expected based on the nation's level of income. Solomon Islands falls into the "very bad" category when evaluating the right to reproductive health because the nation is fulfilling only 38.9% of what the nation is expected to achieve based on the resources (income) it has available.

Female life expectancy at birth was at 66.7 years and male life expectancy at birth at 64.9 in 2007. 1990–1995 fertility rate was at 5.5 births per woman. Government expenditure on health per capita was at US$99 (PPP). Healthy life expectancy at birth is at 60 years.

Blond hair occurs in 10% of the population in the islands. After years of questions, studies have resulted in the better understanding of the blond gene. The findings show that the blond hair trait is due to an amino acid change of protein TYRP1. This accounts for the highest occurrence of blond hair outside of European influence in the world. While 10% of Solomon Islanders display the blond phenotype, about 26% of the population carry the recessive trait for it as well.

== Communicable diseases ==
About 35% deaths occurred in 2008 due to communicable diseases and maternal, perinatal, and nutritional conditions. Solomon Islands had 13 cumulative HIV cases from 1994 to 2009 and between 2000 and 2011 confirmed malaria cases decreased steadily. In 2017 lower respiratory infections accounted for 11.18%, neonatal disorders for 3.59%, STI (excluding HIV) for 2.9% of total deaths.

== Noncommunicable diseases ==
Noncommunicable diseases (NCDs) are prime causes of deaths in Pacific islands, and responsible for 60% deaths in Solomon Islands. Premature mortality from NCDs was 1900 in 2016. Ischemic heart disease, stroke and diabetes were the main causes of mortality due to NCDs in 2017.

=== Sustainable development goals and Solomon Islands ===
Over last two decades Solomon Islands has achieved many goals in health outcomes and moving towards fulfilling universal health coverage. Identifying and treating NCDs, addressing manpower shortage in health sector, improving the availability of treatment facilities in all health care centers are the new priorities of Solomon Islands.
