= Health in Tonga =

Within the Pacific, Tonga is recognised to have some of the highest overall health standards, implementing a combination of preventative and immediate strategies to curb rates of communicable disease, child mortality and overall life expectancy. The Tongan government aims to continue such levels of health through achieving their Millennium Development Goals (MDG) detailing their focus on improving their healthcare system within the areas of maternal and infant health as well as improve access to immunisation, safe water and sanitation.

Through data formulated by the World Health Organization and Tonga's Ministry of Health, its population of over 105,000, 75% of the country's mortalities are attributed to non-communicable diseases (NCD) such as strains of cardiovascular and ischemic heart diseases and diabetes. Additionally, 99.9% of the adult population is vulnerable to developing NCDs and despite the launch of Tonga's National Strategy to Prevent and Control NCDs the prevalence of such conditions has continued to rise. Such increases are attributed to the processes of urbanisation and modernisation which popularised a more sedentary lifestyle amongst Tongans and introduced processed and saturated fats into their everyday diets.

Through modernising and nationalising their healthcare system, as well as initiatives headlined by WHO, the overall life expectancy has been on the slow incline being rated at 77 in 2020. Tonga has also had an increased prevalence of infectious diseases such as hepatitis A due to contamination of food and water in more remote areas as well as in 2019 an outbreak of measles which was declared an epidemic across the Pacific due to a decrease in measles vaccinations across the islands.

The Human Rights Measurement Initiative finds that Tonga is fulfilling 74.4% of what it should be fulfilling for the right to health based on its level of income. When looking at the right to health with respect to children, Tonga achieves 98.3% of what is expected based on its current income. In regards to the right to health amongst the adult population, the country achieves only 86.9% of what is expected based on the nation's level of income. Tonga falls into the "very bad" category when evaluating the right to reproductive health because the nation is fulfilling only 38.1% of what the nation is expected to achieve based on the resources (income) it has available.

== Life expectancy ==
Life expectancy in Tonga has experienced some fluctuation due to the increased prevalence of non-communicable diseases (NCD) and also the arise of epidemics in more recent times. The life expectancy (at birth) in 2020 is estimated to be 77 years for both sexes combined. For females at birth the life expectancy is 78.8 which is both higher than the overall rating and also male life expectancy which is 75.4. Infants up to 5 years of age are expected in 2020 to only live a total of 66.86 years, which has slightly increased from 58.76 in 1950–1955. The projected crude birth rate for 2020 is 24.5 per 1,000 people, while the total fertility rate is 2.87 which has dramatically decreased from 7.30 in 1950–1955. The crude death rate from 2015 to 2020 was 4.9 per 1,000 people and the infant mortality rating was 10.3 for both sexes combined per 1,000 live births. As of 2017, the leading causes of deaths in Tonga were Ischemic heart disease increasing by 6.5% since 2007, diabetes which increased at a rate of 16.6% since 2007 and strokes which increased by 5.1% from 2007.

Tonga's top ten causes of death and disability adjusted life years (DALYs) in comparison to other low-middle Socio-demographic Index (SDI) nations.
Cause of Death	Tonga (age-standardised rate per 100,000)	Comparison group mean (low-middle SDI)
Diabetes	3,678.9	957.2
Ischemic heart disease	2,450.8	2,132.1
Stroke	1,492.2	1,994.4
Neonatal disorder	1,463.9	1,667.1
Chronic kidney disease	1,197.7	537.6
Lower respiratory infection	1,164.2	824.7
COPD	1,070.4	1,102.9
Low back pain	765.9	648.8
Cirrhosis	704.6	480.3
Road injuries	671.3	888.8

== Indigenous medical practices ==
=== Herbal medicine ===
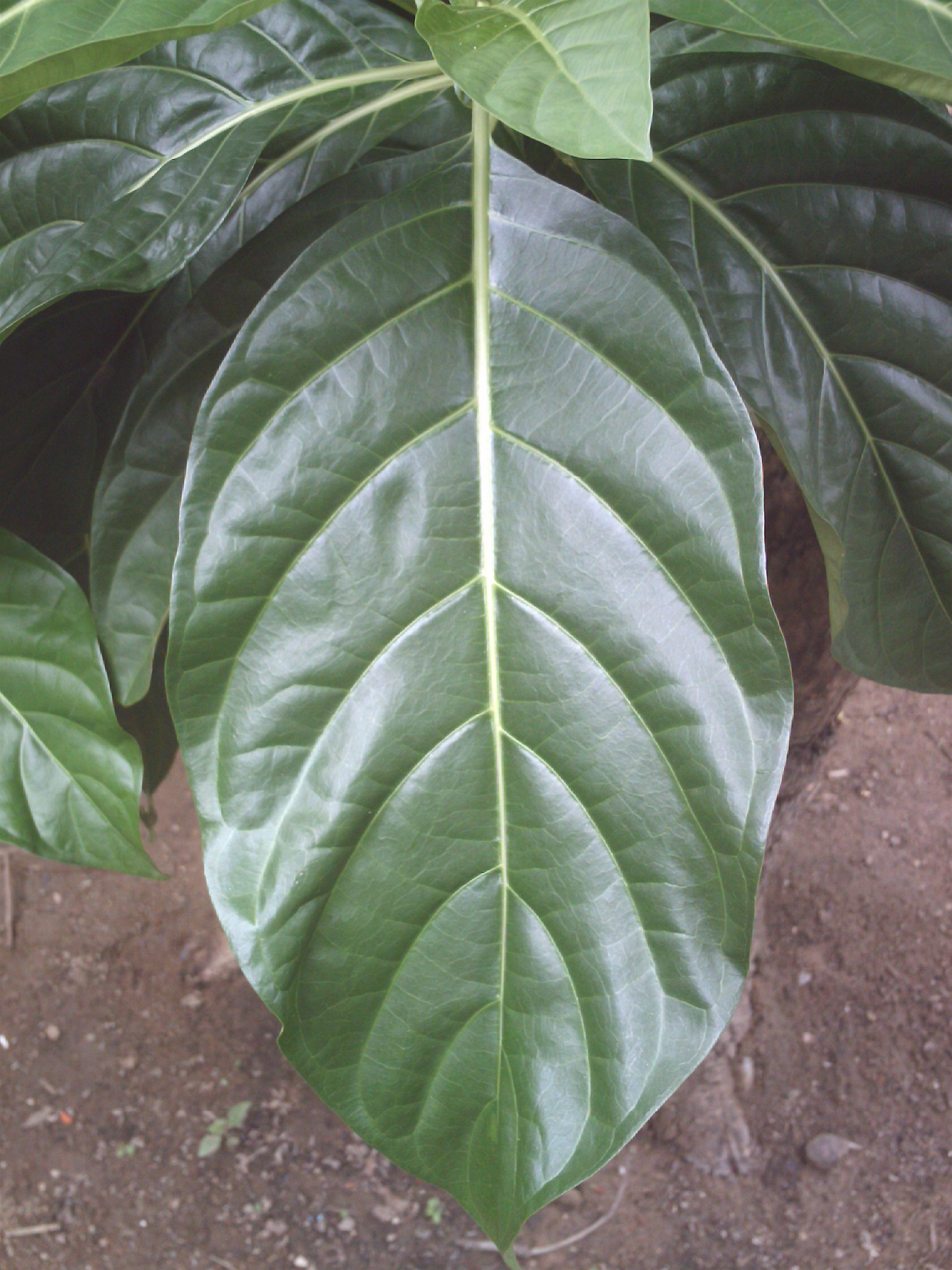
Nonu or Noni leaf, which is pressed to make a juice used for infections like sores, boils and thrush

Herbal and natural medicines play an important role in both past and current health treatments within Tonga. This process is referred to as ethnomedicine where local produce and technologies are used to form medical practices. These practices and illnesses are referred to as mahaki faka-Tonga which are unable to be treated or translated through western medical practices. Treatment falls under three categories which include: invocation, external operations and sacrifices. These can also be further divided into spirit related illnesses, which are often treated through invocation and sacrifice, and ordinary/physical illnesses, treated through surgery and herbs.

Traditional Tongan medicines have incorporated over one hundred plants found locally around the islands and wider Pacific which are used frequently to treat both physical and mental illnesses and also in traditional ceremonies. Native Tongans developed their natural medical and surgical practices from Fijian tribes during conflict. Natural medical processes included the use of plants as well as offerings and symbols such as sacrifice and torture which were believed to alleviate the sickness of a noble. Practices such as tootoonima and nawgia which mean the removal of the fingers and strangulation of children were used traditionally in the past to reverse the pain and illness of a noble.

The details below show the most common plants used within traditional Tongan medicines and the ways they are used to treat a variety of conditions.

==== Ango Hina ====
Has similar properties to turmeric and is used through a process which extracts the nutrients from the root which is then placed on various skin conditions such as rashes.

==== Manonu tree ====
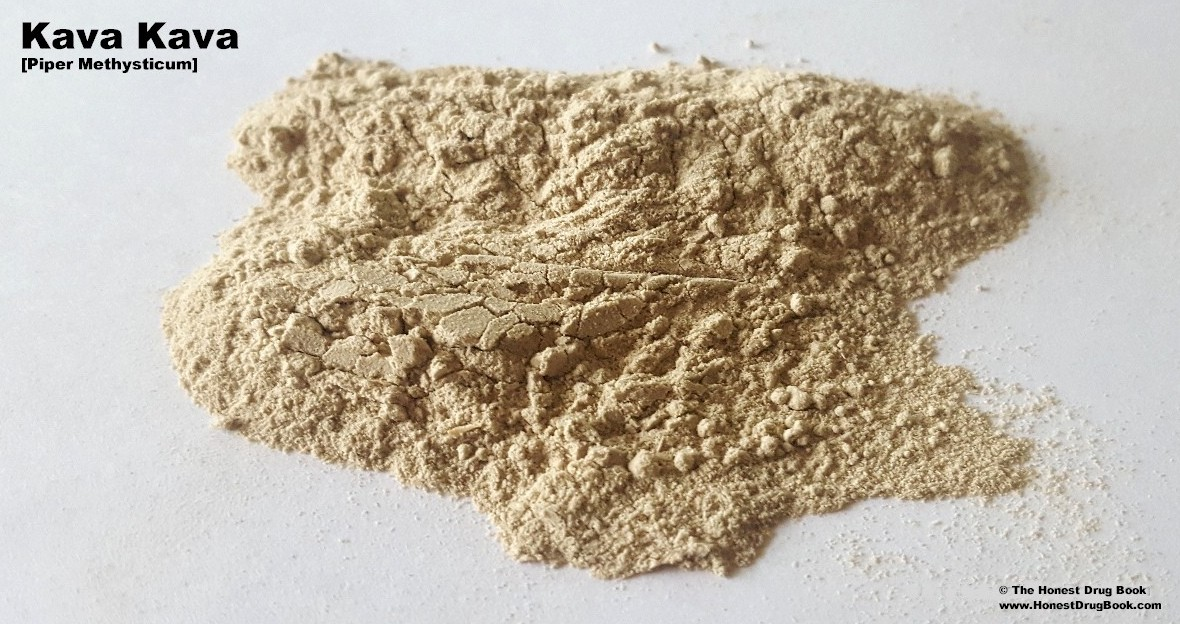
Crushed Kava root, which is used in drinks for its healing properties and also for many ceremonial and recreational uses due to its classification as a depressant and relaxer

The bark and leaves are removed from the tree and then wrapped around various parts of the body to treat wounds or ailments which function in similar ways to cloth and cotton dressings used more commonly in western medicine.

==== Kava ====
Contained within the pepper family, Kava is a root which is crushed or ground into a powder before being added to water to create a drink used often in traditional ceremonies or gatherings. The root is also classified as a depressant and therefore can serve as an alternative treatment for conditions such as anxiety or to be used as a relaxant. However, due to this, the root is also classified as a drug and when used recreationally outside of traditional or medical purposes can have serious long term effects such as bipolar disorders and severe weight loss.

==== Nonu or Noni ====
Leaves are extracted from the noni tree and are typically pressed into a juice which can be drunk daily or used to treat more specific infections such as sores, boils and thrush of the gums.

==== Common conditions and treatment ====
It is seen that predominately women receive treatment with natural medicines particularly for issues which arise during pregnancy as it is viewed as less invasive and harmful for the child. Women also predominately use traditional medicines due to the Tongan syndrome of Kahi which affects mostly adult women caused by an increased intake of salty or fatty foods, smoking, withholding bowel motions and drinking carbonated beverages which then causes swellings in the vulva, backaches and is even linked to infertility. Traditional methods of treatment for Kahi and other obstetric or gynaecological conditions include remedies from native flora easily accessible along the islands. Mango leaves and Tavahi bark scrapings are infused and drunk daily by women to relieve their symptoms.

Herbal medicines are also particularly important sociologically as they are linked to traditional Tongan beliefs and traditions in regards to their nation specific diseases. In Tongan culture the term mahaki faka Tonga which translates to "Indigenous or Tongan diseases" refers to the first wave of diseases that existed prior to European invasion and the arrival of Western Medicine in 1797, were only to be treated through traditional methods. These diseases include disorders related to the presence of ghosts or spirits of a dead person, which are said to inhabit the nervous, gastrointestinal, urinary and musculoskeletal system and causing various symptoms of joint sprains, vomiting and hysteria.

=== Traditional healers ===
Natural medicine within Tonga also incorporates the role of traditional healers, referred to as Kau faito'o, who are considered to have a high level of knowledge and expertise regarding ethnomedical practices and pharmacology. Traditional healers are known to have extensive knowledge of Tongan spirit illnesses which are caused by disturbances in the relationship between the physical, such as society or the land, and the spiritual, being gods and supernatural beings. Initially this was done by 'Priest' healers prior to the spread of Christianity throughout Tonga and they were viewed to be the only entity able to communicate between sick individuals and the gods.

A healer will apply techniques of conversation and discussion, natural and native remedies and massaging affected areas where appropriate. Healers are predominately women and acquire their skills through observation of elders within their family or native tribe allowing for traditional medical practices to be passed from generations with little change. Healers also are said to only receive their power to heal through the process of fanofano which means the washing of one's hands. This ritual takes place at the end of a prospective healer's learning journey, when they are seen to have acquired the necessary knowledge and skill required to be a healer. In more contemporary times the ceremony and exchange of power has been replaced by simpler acts such as a handshake.

Healers are respected within local communities however still retain the same social standing as the rest of the population as healing is considered a side practice to normal daily duties and tasks. Healers often also do not expect or receive compensation in the form of money like general practitioners, rather they are presented with small gifts or tokens such as food or cultural artefacts as a thank you for their treatment. In the cases of illnesses related to spirits and possession by a spirit, known as āvanga or lo'oa, the healer will utilise techniques of massage and fragrant medicinal plants infused as oils to help heed the presence of the spirit.

== Healthcare ==
The healthcare system provided to the population of Tonga is controlled and subsidised by the Ministry of Health and Tongan Federal Government under the Health Services Act 1991. The Ministry of Health takes sole responsibility of the health of the population, with the s. 4 of the Act stipulating their need to:

(a) to preserve and protect the public health of Tonga;

(b) to establish and maintain a service, available to all, to promote the physical and mental health and well-being of the populace;

(c) to provide and maintain comprehensive hospital and community health services with facilities for the investigation, diagnosis, treatment, rehabilitation from, and prevention of disease and ill- health.

Hence the universal healthcare system provided by the Ministry of Health is subsidised for the population with majority of the financing being done by the Ministry of Health in addition to corporate partnerships and donor funding. Government expenditure on healthcare attributes to an annual average 12% of total spending as well as 4% of its Gross Domestic Product (GDP). The Tongan Government finances 47% of healthcare, with 38% being paid by development partners and the remaining 15% by out-of-pocket expenses from the population. These partners include and are not limited to the Governments of Australia and New Zealand, Australian Department of Foreign Affairs and Trade (DFAT), WHO, UN and the United Nations International Children's Emergency Fund (UNICEF).

Partnerships with DFAT led to the creation of the Tonga Health Systems Support Program, which focused on addressing key health concerns such as obesity and tobacco usage as well as regulate overall health outcomes for the population. Through the program, NCD related mortality decreased from 552.5 deaths per 100,000 people in 2010 to 536.5 per 100,000 people in 2017. There was a 7% reduction in the number of smokers moving from 21.6% in 2010 to 14.6% in 2017 and a 6% decrease in alcohol consumption from 16.4% in 2010 to 10.4% in 2017. Both phase one and two of the program funded 13.5% of Tonga's annual budgetary health expenditure for the period 2017–18, which allowed for the creation of disability-inclusive health cover and the management of specialised health centres like the Vaiola Hospital Diabetes Centre which has reduced the number of diabetics who cease treatment.

In more recent times, WHO has continued their National Health Strategic Plan for Tongan healthcare under their broader country cooperation strategy, aiming to implement changes to help develop the country's outbreak and alert systems and access to immunisation following the recent outbreak of measles across the Pacific.

In terms of its health infrastructure, Tonga's national hospital Vaiola is located in the capital, Nuku’alofa which is accompanied by four additional hospitals located in the regions of Niu’eiki, Niu’ui, Prince Wellington Ngu, and Likamonu and 14 Community Health Centres across its various islands which are accessed by 98% of the population. At the end of 2016 there was said to be a total of 71 doctors and 454 nurses working within the region, most of which are trained internationally as well as regionally at the Queen Salote School of Nursing.

Healthcare expenditure per person in Tonga is expected to double by 2050 increasing from a total of US$219 in 2016 to US$418, with total government expenditure per person increasing from US$123 in 2016 to a contribution of US$286 in 2050.

== Health concerns ==
See Also: Obesity in the Pacific

=== Obesity ===
Prevalence of obesity in the adult population, top countries (2016), Tonga has the fifth highest rate in the world.

As of 2016, 48.2% of the adult population of Tonga was classified as obese, ranking it the 7th highest country in the world in relation to the percentage of their population which is obese, with other Pacific regions like Nauru and the Cook Islands taking out the first and second spots. Due to this, over 40% of the population is thought to suffer from type 2 diabetes, which is thought to correlate to a number of socioeconomic and lifestyle factors following the modernisation of the country. This led to obesity being labelled an "epidemic" within Tonga and the wider regions of the Pacific.

Rates of obesity and overweight adult men and women within Tonga were as high as 84% and 93% respectively within the early 2000s. For adolescents, 36% of boys and 53.8% of girls aged 11–16 years old were classified as overweight and obese in 2012.

Historically, Polynesians have had a bigger build compared to the standard Anglo-Saxon or Eurocentric anatomy, which has suggested the need for a restructuring of the Body Mass Index (BMI) to cater for this. Globalisation has had a significant impact on the nutrition and levels of physical activity amongst the adult population leading the preference of a more sedentary lifestyle and importing of less nutritious and high fat foods. Traditionally, Tongan's consumed a diet of mostly freshly sourced produce native to the region which included fish, root vegetables and coconuts, with meat and protein only being a supplement to vegetables and healthy carbohydrates. Salted meats and fatty proteins were introduced to the region through various colonial intrusions such as missionaries, explorers and whalers. This problem was furthered leading to the increasing of Tongan obesity ratings due to the importing of mutton flaps from New Zealand and other internationally sourced meats such as turkey legs from the United States. Mutton flaps are known to contain 40g of fat per 100g, 50% of which is considered to be saturated fat and known to increase the risk of becoming overweight and developing NCDs. Imports of mutton flaps to Tonga in 2002 were equivalent to approximately 3 million kilograms which is equivalent to 500g per capita/week. Health and diet practitioners note that just through reducing consumption of mutton flaps by 50% and replacing this with fish, individuals would be consuming 30g less fat and 15g less salt daily.

These lifestyle and societal changes have led to an increased prevalence of type 2 diabetes amongst the population. Rates of diabetes amongst men have increased from 3.1% in 1973 to being 14.8% in 2012. For Women they have increased to a higher degree being 7.0% in 1973 to 21.7% in 2012. This can also be attributed to the lack of knowledge on NCDs and their causes in terms of obesity within the general population of Tonga.

However, there have been improvements made in relation to obesity and physical activity amongst the adult population in Tonga. In the STEPS surveys conducted by WHO and the Tongan Ministry of Health, physical activity amongst adults increased by 20% from 2004 to 2012. Additionally, prevalence of overweight and obese adults also marginally improved decreasing by 1.4% and 1.1% respectively between 2004 and 2012.

=== Smoking ===
The control of Tobacco usage and prevalence amongst Tongan communities is also a health concern attributed to helping slow the growth of NCDs within the Pacific region. Tobacco is widely available to the public which contributes to the higher levels of youth and adolescent tobacco use within the region with 245 tobacco outlets located within the capital Nuku'alofa alone. Surveys from 2007 found that 15% of boys aged 11–17 had smoked with 19% smoking on a daily basis compared to girls which was 16% for having smoked before and 6% smoking on a daily basis.

The Ministry of Health's 2012 Demographic and Health Survey showed that 14% of women and 48% of men within the age of 15–49 smoke cigarettes daily. The survey also showed that peak users for women were within the age bracket of 25–34 which also correlates to the most common ages for child bearing within Tonga which can lead to complications during birth or premature and underweight newborn babies.

Additionally, in 2015 it was noted that 36.6% of males and 7.5% of females with NCDs such as cancer, cardiovascular disease and diabetes were daily users of tobacco. This prompted a legislative change within Tonga to restrict smoking on church, work and school premises to reduce the levels of tobacco usage and NCDs caused by individual factors and habits.

The Tongan government and Ministry of Health have headlined initiatives to reduce tobacco usage within both adolescents and adults through introducing banning of tobacco advertisements under the Tobacco Control Act 2000. The Act bans tobacco companies from advertising on all forms of media as well as from obtaining sponsorship agreements.

== Infectious diseases ==
=== Measles ===
See Also: 2019 Tonga measles outbreak, 2019 measles outbreaks

==== Measles outbreak 2019 ====
Tonga and other nations located in the Pacific region such as Samoa and Fiji faced an outbreak of measles in late October 2019 following similar occurrences in 2010 and 2017. The outbreak occurred following the arrival of a Tongan youth rugby team who were suspected to have contracted the virus whilst in New Zealand. The outbreak initially spread through schools located on the islands of Tongatapu and Vava'u. This placed individuals aged 15–29 to be most at risk of contracting the virus, as well as children under the age of 5 who had not yet been vaccinated against the virus. Individuals aged 15–19 accounted for 44.7% of positive cases as of February 2020. The outbreak within the region was also attributed to a growing opposition to vaccinations and the growth of anti-vaccinations movements within Samoa following the death of two infants who had received measles vaccinations.

The Tongan government and Ministry of Health created an Epidemic Task Force (ETF) which held weekly meetings to confer on how the outbreak should be managed. Within Tonga during the period from December 2019 to February 2020 the number of total confirmed cases rose from 440 to 659. To help reduce the number of new cases the ETF instituted a vaccination program targeting those aged 10–24 aiming to re-vaccinate an estimated 15,000 people. As a result of this Tonga was able to achieve a vaccination rate of 90% within the first month of the declared epidemic through the help of UNICEF which provided 14,500 doses of the measles vaccine to Tonga. As of February 2020 there have been 21 hospitalisations and no mortalities relating to measles within the outbreak in Tonga.

As of May 2020, health authorities are still employing management plans to ensure the stability of Tongan health infrastructure and prevent future viral outbreaks.
