= Health in Albania =

Aspect of life in Albania

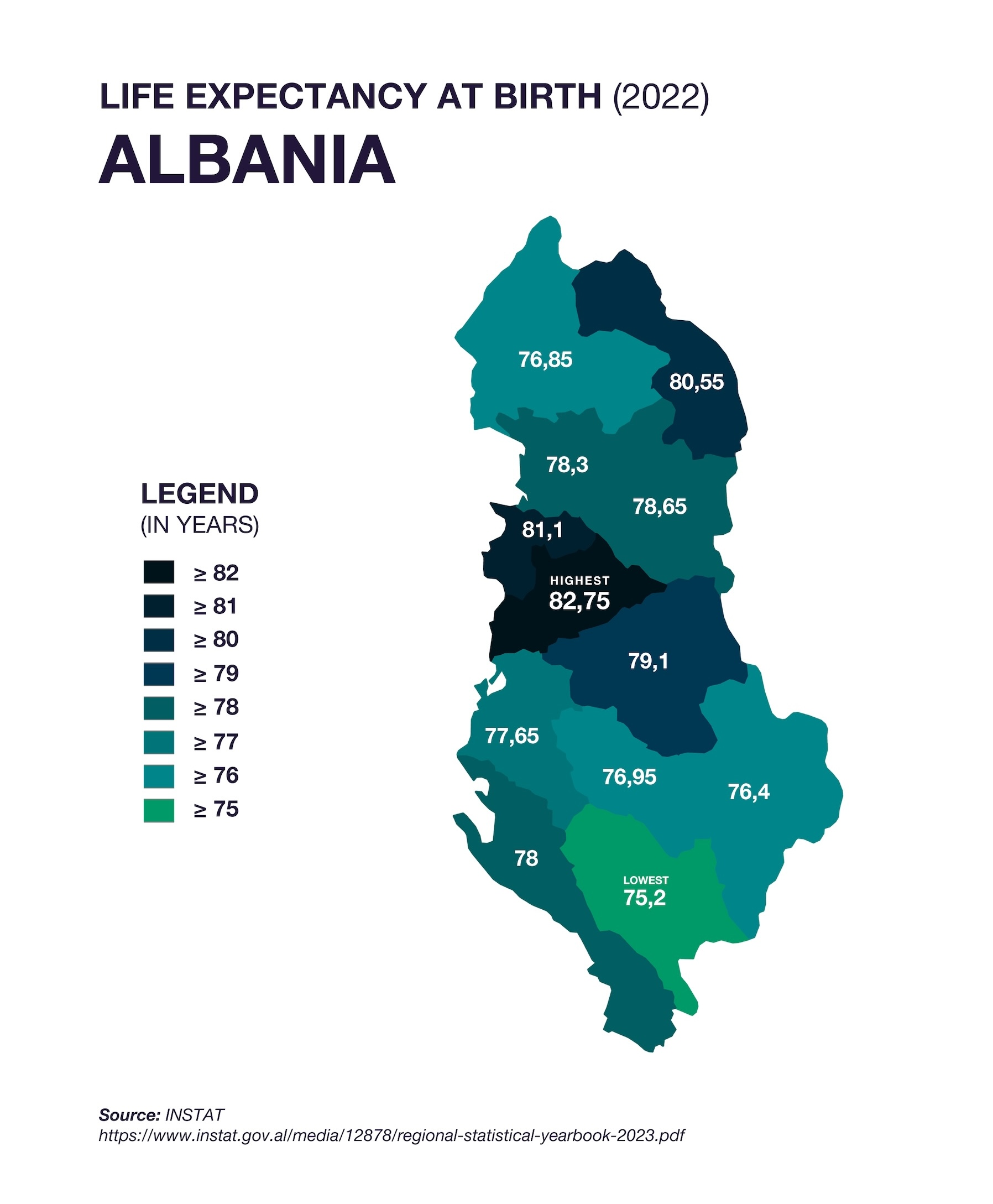
Regional life expectancy at birth in Albania (2022)

Life expectancy at birth in Albania was 80.6 years in 2024, outperforming a number of European Union countries, such as Estonia, Poland and the Czech Republic. Tirana, Albania's capital and most populous city, had a life expectancy at birth of 82.8 years in 2022, remarkably high for the region, outperforming significantly wealthier capital cities in Western Europe, such as Vienna and Berlin.

The most common causes of death are circulatory diseases followed by cancerous illnesses. Demographic and Health Surveys completed a survey in April 2009, detailing various health statistics in Albania, including male circumcision, abortion and more.

The general improvement of health conditions in the country is reflected in the lower mortality rate, down to an estimated 6.49 deaths per 1,000 in 2000, as compared with 17.8 per 1,000 in 1938. Albania's infant mortality rate, estimated at 20 per 1,000 live births in 2000, has also declined over the years since the high rate of 151 per 1,000 live births in 1960. There were 69,802 births in 1999 and the fertility rate in 1999 was 2.5 while the maternal mortality rate was 65 per 100,000 live births in 1993. In addition, in 1997, Albania had high immunization rates for children up to one year old: tuberculosis at 94%; diphtheria, pertussis, and tetanus, 99%; measles, 95%; and polio, 99.5%. In 1996, the incidence of tuberculosis was 23 in 100,000 people. In 1995 there were two reported cases of AIDS and seven cases in 1996. In 2000 the number of people living with HIV/AIDS was estimated at less than 100. The leading causes of death are cardiovascular disease, trauma, cancer, and respiratory disease. In 2015 it still had the highest mortality in Europe, at 766 per 100,000 population, the highest rate of death from non-communicable diseases (672 per 100,000) and the second highest rate of male smokers in Europe - 51%.

The Albanian Public Health Institute, in Tirana was founded in 1935.

Albania became a member of the World Health Organization on May 26, 1947.

The Human Rights Measurement Initiative finds that Albania is fulfilling 67.0% of what it should be fulfilling for the right to health based on its level of income. When looking at the right to health with respect to children, Albania achieves 98.3% of what is expected based on its current income. In regards to the right to health amongst the adult population, the country achieves 98.0% of what is expected based on the nation's level of income. Albania falls into the "very bad" category when evaluating the right to reproductive health because the nation is fulfilling only 4.6% of what the nation is expected to achieve based on the resources (income) it has available.

== See also ==
- Healthcare in Albania
