= Disability in Antigua and Barbuda =

Disability in Antigua and Barbuda refers to the people with disability in Antigua and Barbuda.

== History ==
The Government of Antigua and Barbuda signed the Convention on the Rights of Persons with Disabilities on 30 March 2007 and ratified it on 7 January 2016.

== Statistics ==
In 2019, cardiovascular disease, diabetes and cancers were the top causes of death and disability in the country.

== See also ==
- Antigua and Barbuda at the Paralympics
