= Health in Austria =

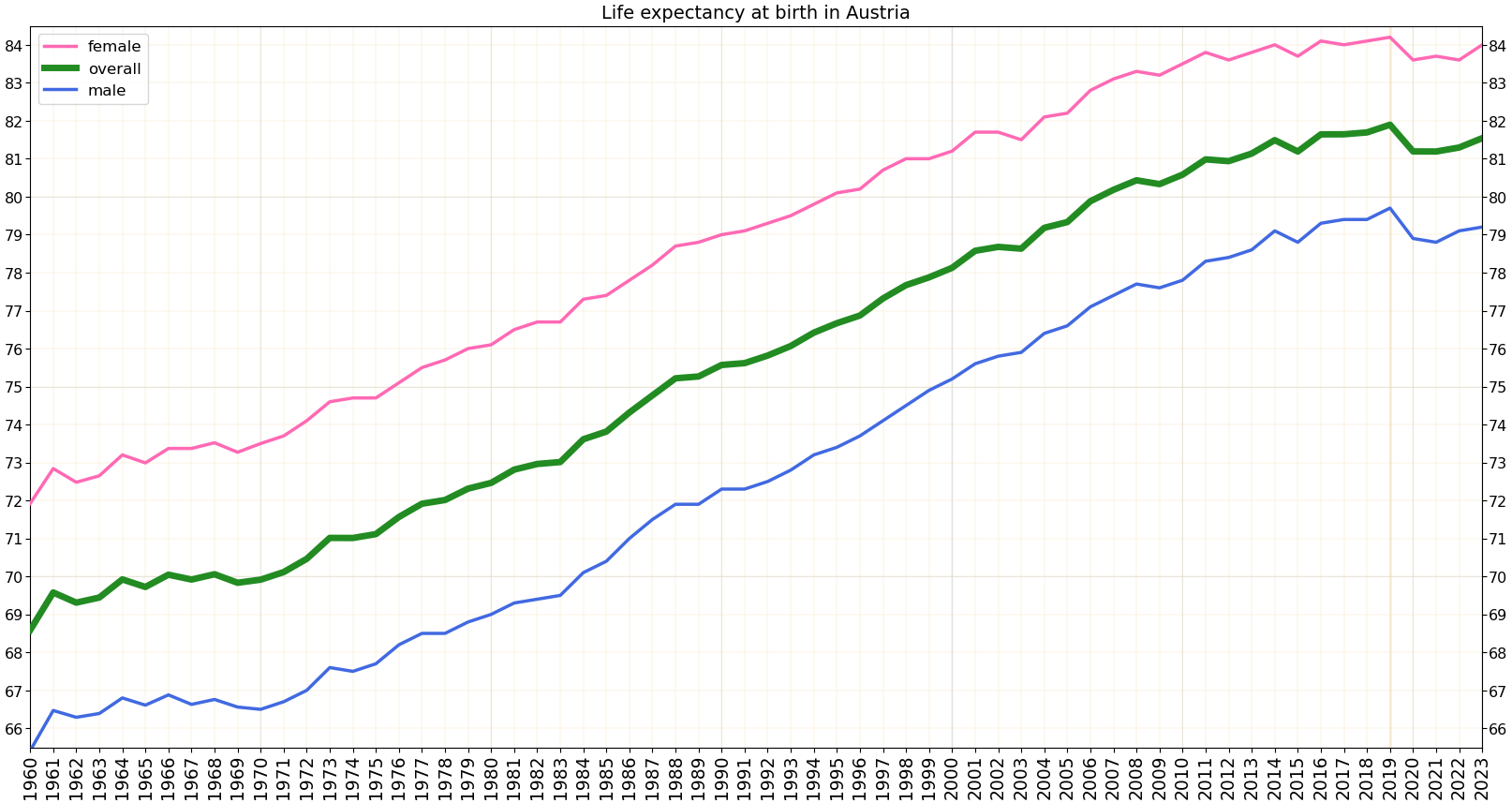
Life expectancy at birth in Austria

Legislation on public health issues in Austria is fragmented and in some cases outdated and patchy according to the European Observatory on Health Systems and Policies.

There is an Austrian Public Health Association (Österreichische Gesellschaft für Public Health).

A new measure of expected human capital calculated for 195 countries from 1990 to 2016 and defined for each birth cohort as the expected years lived from age 20 to 64 years and adjusted for educational attainment, learning or education quality, and functional health status was published by The Lancet in September 2018. Austria had the nineteenth highest level of expected human capital with 24 health, education, and learning-adjusted expected years lived between age 20 and 64 years.

== History ==
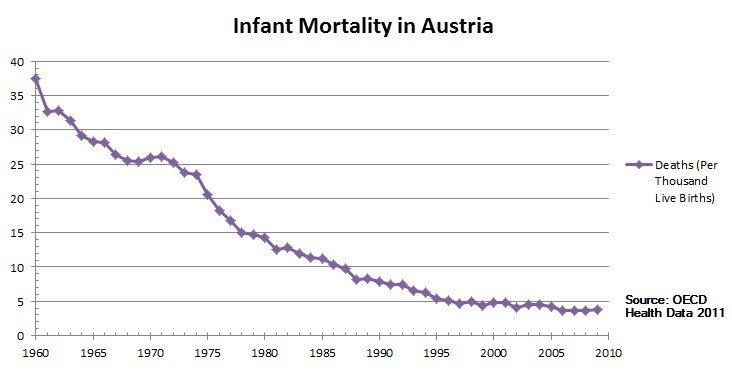
Infant mortality between 1960 and 2009 declined immensely in Austria.

Between 1914 and 1918 the average weight of a nine-year-old in Vienna dropped from 30 kg to 22.8 kg. Milk consumption in the city fell in the same period from 900,000 litres daily to 70,000.

== See also ==
- Healthcare in Austria
- Obesity in Austria
