= Health in the Isle of Man =

Life expectancy on the Isle of Man at birth was estimated at 81.3 years in 2017, 79.6 years for men and 83.2 years for women. The Infant mortality rate was 4 deaths per 1,000 live births. The birth rate in 2016 reached a 30-year low. Between 1996, and 2016 the number of people over 95 years of age increased by 188%.

== Public health ==
The Public Health Directorate has a budget of around £1.6 million a year. It runs school awareness programmes and the Stoptober anti-smoking scheme. Henrietta Ewart is the Director of Public Health.

About a quarter of five year olds have tooth decay. A three-month supervised toothbrushing pilot project in six nurseries was started in September 2017 organised by the Public Health Directorate, with plans for a wider programme starting in 2018.

== See also ==
- Healthcare in the Isle of Man
