= Health in Belarus =

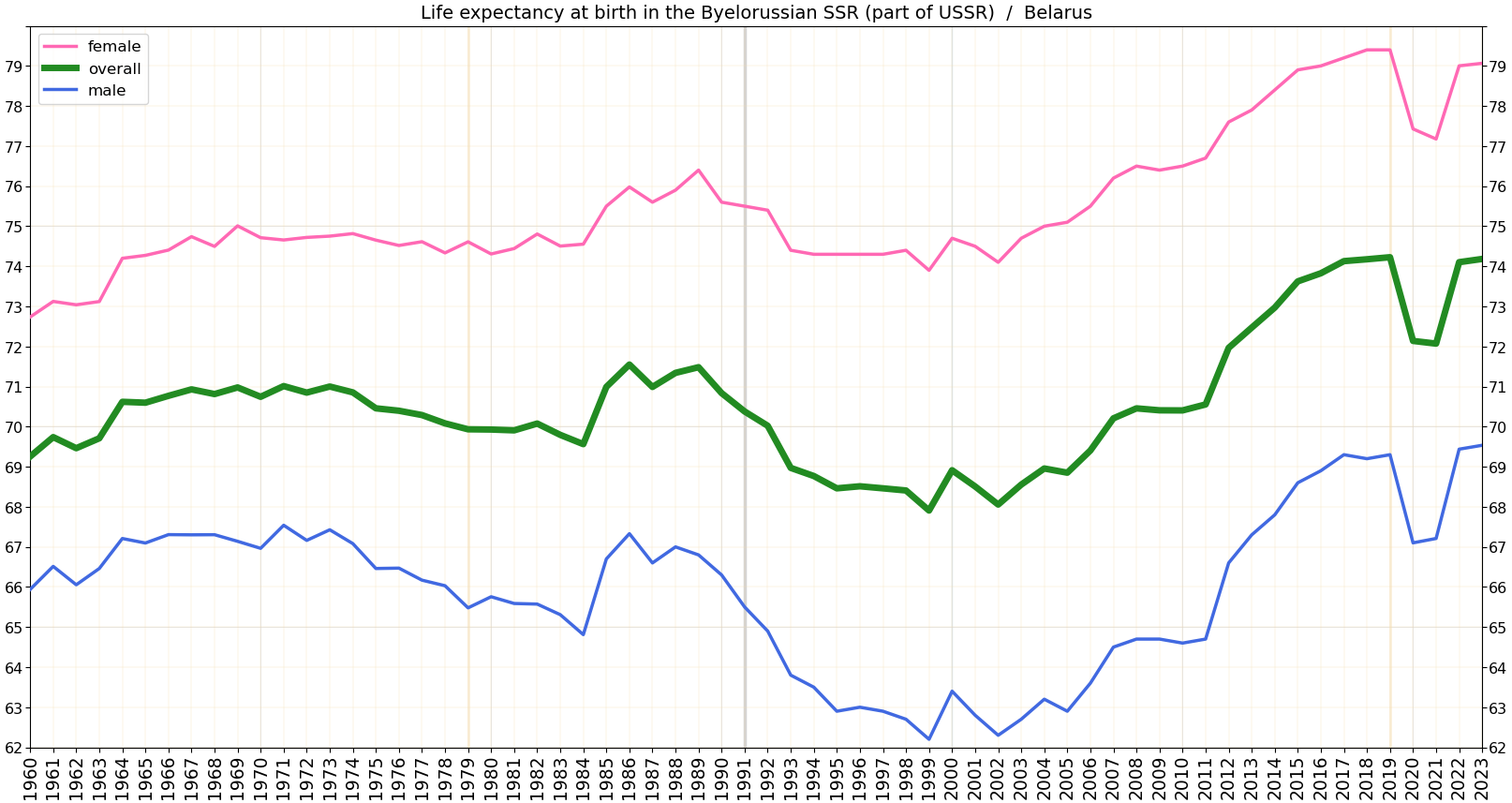
Life expectancy at birth in Belarus

Life expectancy at birth in Belarus was 69 for men and 79 for women in 2016.

A new measure of expected human capital calculated for 195 countries from 1990 to 2016 and defined for each birth cohort as the expected years lived from age 20 to 64 years and adjusted for educational attainment, learning or education quality, and functional health status was published by The Lancet in September 2018. Belarus had the twenty-second highest level of expected human capital with 23 health, education, and learning-adjusted expected years lived between age 20 and 64 years.

The Human Rights Measurement Initiative finds that Belarus is fulfilling 86.0% of what it should be fulfilling for the right to health based on its level of income. When looking at the right to health with respect to children, Belarus achieves 100.0% of what is expected based on its current income. In regards to the right to health amongst the adult population, the country achieves 84.1% of what is expected based on the nation's level of income. Belarus falls into the "very bad" category when evaluating the right to reproductive health because the nation is fulfilling only 74.0% of what the nation is expected to achieve based on the resources (income) it has available.

== See also ==
- Healthcare in Belarus
- COVID-19 pandemic in Belarus
