= Climate change in Azerbaijan =

Emissions, impacts and responses of Azerbaijan related to climate change

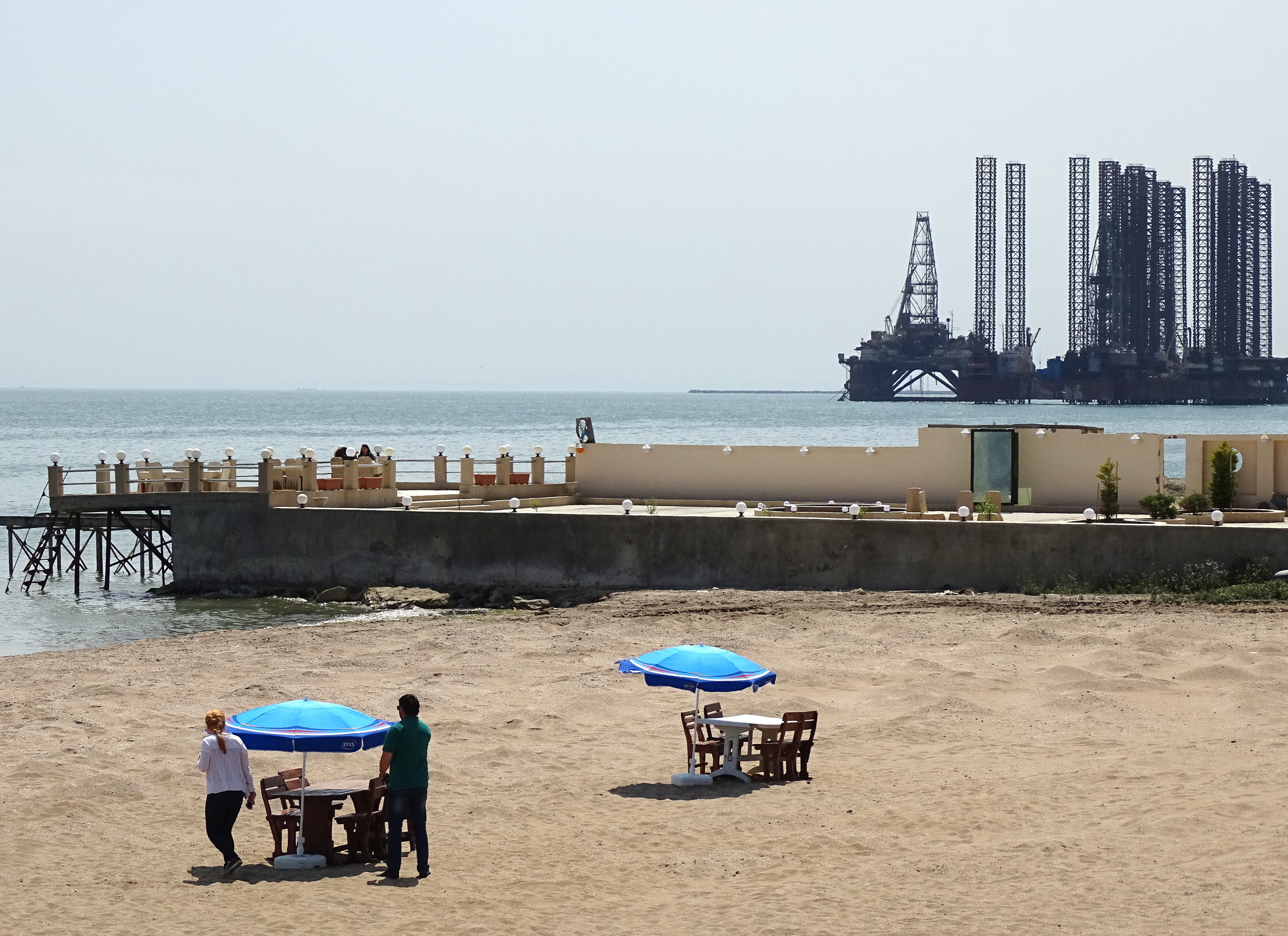
Greenhouse gas emissions are mostly from oil and gas

Köppen climate classification map for Azerbaijan for 1980–2016

2071–2100 map under the most intense climate change scenario. Mid-range scenarios are currently considered more likely

Climate change has had serious consequences in Azerbaijan since the start of the 21st century. The climate of Azerbaijan was 1.3 degrees hotter by 2010. The Caspian Sea is shrinking. Azerbaijan will host the 2024 United Nations Climate Change Conference, known as COP29.

== Description ==
Climate Trace estimates 2022 greenhouse gas emissions will reach 91 million tonnes CO2eq, with over 40% of emissions from fossil fuel production. The petroleum industry in Azerbaijan exports fossil gas. Over 90% of exports from Azerbaijan are petroleum-based. Azerbaijan has over 7 billion barrels of proven crude oil reserves under the Caspian Sea. Energy consumption is estimated at about 16% of GHG, while transportation is estimated at about 10% of GHG.

The climate of Azerbaijan has increased by 1.3 degrees, while extreme weather events are increasing. The water level of the Caspian Sea is falling.Forests in the Caucasus are affected. Ecological problems on the coast are being worsened by climate change.

In the post-Soviet economic period, the Azerbaijani economy has become state-controlled and oil-based. Oil is the main contributor to the Azerbaijan economy; decreases in oil prices negatively affect the entire country. Cotton may be the most affected agriculture in Azerbaijan, which is sensitive to climate change. In 2023, the Minister of Agriculture reported that the country is engaging in climate-smart agriculture. Fishing is affected. Stranded assets are a long-term risk. Azerbaijani health may suffer from the extreme heat and a longer malaria season.

== Mitigation and adaptation ==
As of 2023 there is no net zero target. There are intermediate GHG reduction targets. The country's second Nationally Determined Contribution includes a 40% reduction compared to 1990. It may be possible to produce low-carbon hydrogen.

A national adaptation plan is hoped to be published in 2024. COP29 is being hosted in Baku in 2024, probably in November; it will be the third oil-producing country in a row to host the conference. Cooperative Mechanisms under Article 6 of the Paris Agreement may be discussed. Some have criticised that the country was chosen to host COP29 and say that environmental activists are repressed. Media freedom in Azerbaijan is restricted, including around discussions of climate change.

There is a Youth Climate Envoys programme.

== See also ==
- Energy in Azerbaijan
- Environment of Azerbaijan
