= 2024 United Nations Climate Change Conference =

Yearly conference held for climate change treaty negotiations

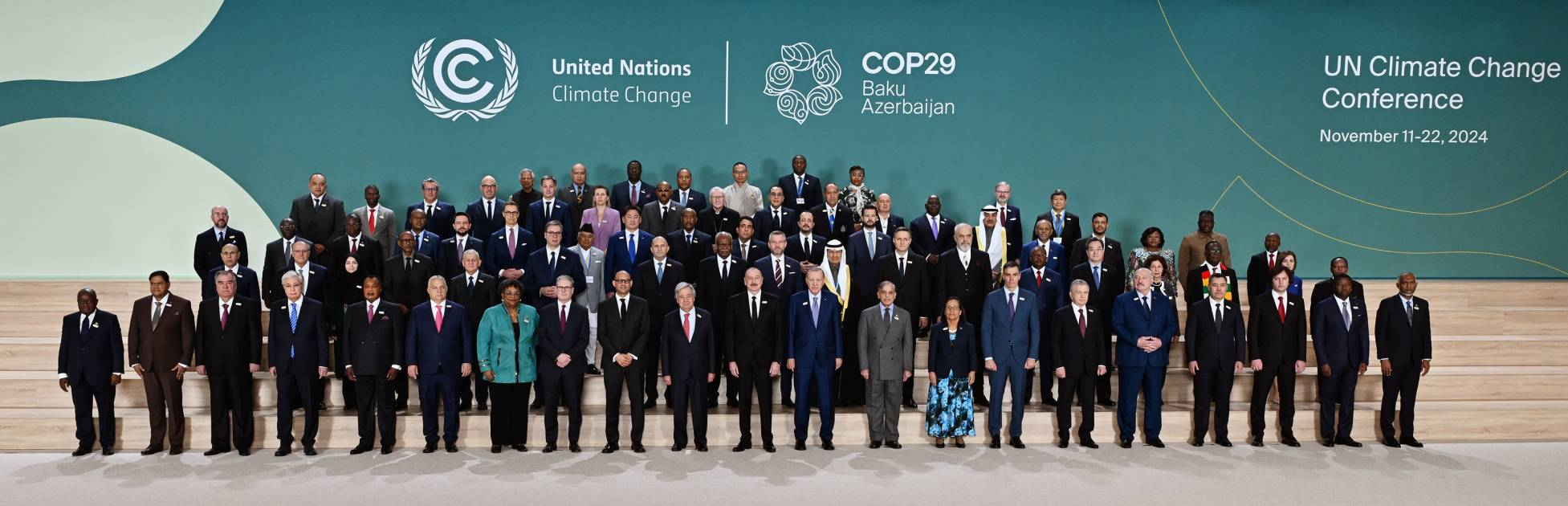
- Native name: Birləşmiş Millətlər Təşkilatının İqlim Dəyişikliyi Konfransı (2024)
- Date: 11–22 November
- Location: Baku Olympic Stadium, Baku, Azerbaijan
- Organised by: Azerbaijan
- Participants: UNFCCC member countries
- President: Mukhtar Babayev
- Previous event: ← Dubai 2023
- Next event: → Belém 2025
- Website: cop29.az

The 2024 United Nations Climate Change Conference or Conference of the Parties of the UNFCCC, more commonly known as COP29, was the 29th United Nations Climate Change conference. It was held at Baku Olympic Stadium in Baku, Azerbaijan, from 11 to 22 November 2024. Mukhtar Babayev presided, while Samir Nuriyev headed the Organising Committee.

The conference concluded with an agreement on plans for finance to mitigate the effects of climate change and help developing nations transition to more sustainable energy sources. Rules and a UN registry were agreed to facilitate and record international trading of carbon credits.

The choice of Azerbaijan as the location for the conference was controversial because it is a major oil and gas producer and authoritarian state with extensive corruption, with several "official partners" of COP29 being businesses directly owned by President of Azerbaijan Ilham Aliyev, or tied to the Aliyev family's businesses. Most G7 leaders chose not to attend the conference.

== Background ==
Azerbaijan signed the Paris Agreement—an agreement within the United Nations Framework Convention on Climate Change (UNFCCC)—on 22 April 2016. It was ratified on 9 January 2017, and entered into force on 8 February 2017.

In January 2024, Mukhtar Babayev, a longtime official of Azeri state-owned oil company SOCAR and Minister of Ecology and Natural Resources, was appointed as president of the COP29. Azerbaijan reportedly paid New York-based PR firm Teneo US$4.7 million to manage public relations for the event.

== Critique of choice of location ==
Baku Olympic Stadium hosted COP29.

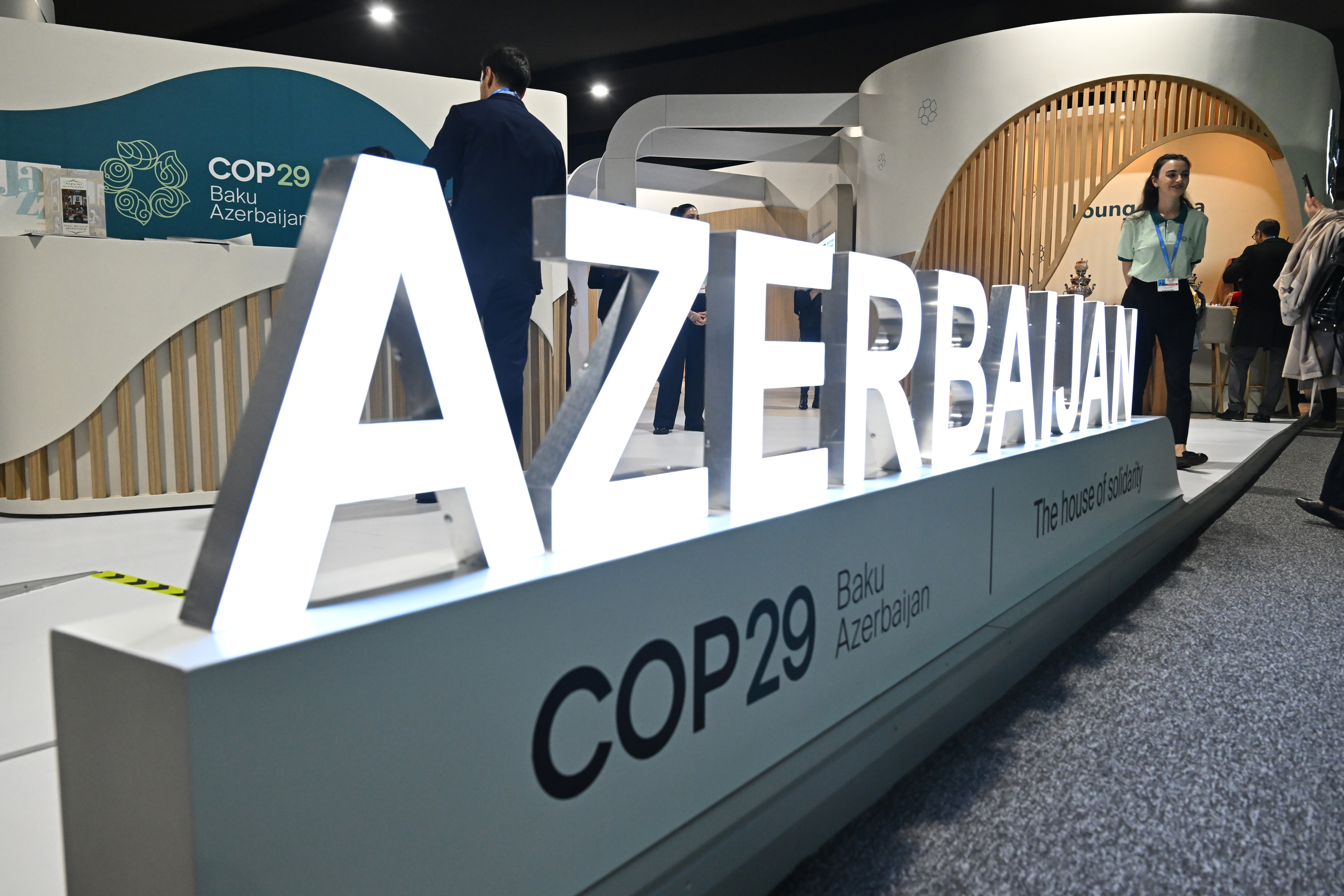
COP29 in Azerbaijan

In December 2023, Azerbaijan was announced as the host of the conference. Held on a rotating schedule, the annual COP summit was set to be hosted by an Eastern European nation. However, Reuters reported that, during the previous COP28 meeting in Dubai, Eastern European countries had agreed to back Azerbaijan's bid for the 2024 edition.

Critics argued that hosting COP29 in Azerbaijan was inappropriate due to the country's poor human rights record and an alleged ethnic cleansing against the Armenian population in the Nagorno-Karabakh region. They also highlighted that Azerbaijan was a major fossil fuel producer, with an authoritarian government extensively linked to corruption, and saw the choice to assign hosting rights for the COP29 to the country as a way to greenwash its reputation.

Additionally, concerns were raised about the government's repression of journalists and environmental activists before the conference, indicating a suppression of free speech and civil society. Michael Rubin, senior fellow at the American Enterprise Institute, wrote that COP29 risked legitimizing Azerbaijani President Ilham Aliyev's authoritarian government, comparing the occurrence to the political exploitation of the 1936 Summer Olympics by Adolf Hitler's regime. Reporters and anti-corruption non-profits also criticized extensive corruption occurring in the country, with "official partners" of COP29 being businesses that were either owned directly by or tied to the Aliyev family.

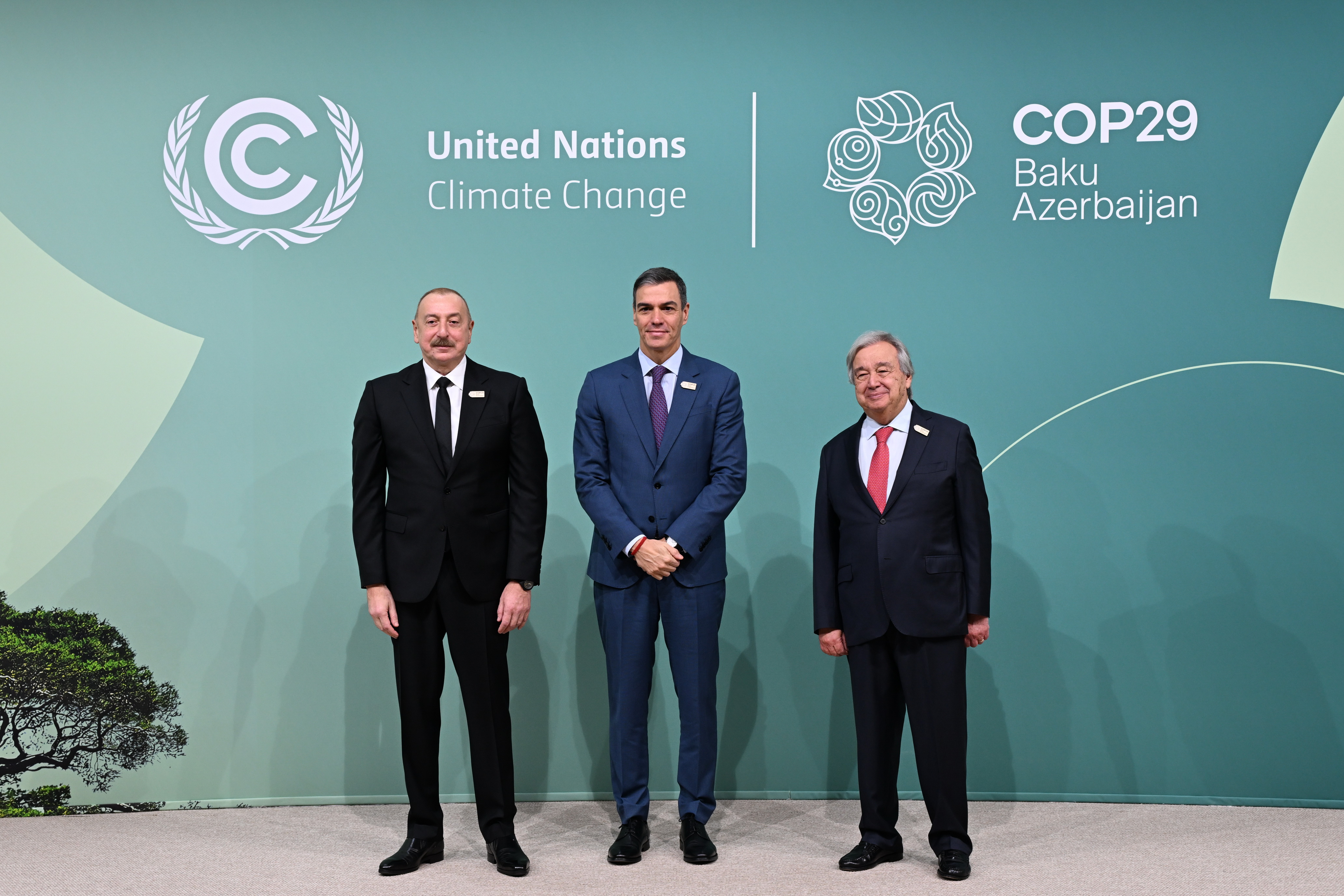
Ilham Aliyev with Spanish Prime Minister Pedro Sánchez and UN Secretary-General António Guterres in Baku, Azerbaijan, 12 November 2024

Amnesty International said the Host Country Agreement (HCA) between Azerbaijan and the UNFCCC should include arrangements that guaranteed that "all human rights [were] protected and respected", and must be made public immediately, citing Azerbaijan's human rights violations. The rights group drew a comparison with the situation during COP28, which had been hosted by the United Arab Emirates, stating that it had made multiple efforts to obtain the HCA signed in August 2023. Amnesty received a copy of COP28's HCA in June 2024, and revealed that it had "significant shortcomings and ambiguities" in rights protections offered to the participants in Dubai.

On 11 November 2024, climate activist Greta Thunberg attended a rally in Tbilisi, the capital of Georgia, to protest Azerbaijan's hosting of the COP29. Thunberg and other activists criticized Azerbaijan's repressive government, and use of the summit to "greenwash" human rights abuses. She called it "absurd" to hold climate talks in an "authoritarian petrostate" amid rising emissions and a climate crisis.

Azerbaijani President Ilham Aliyev described the criticism as a "smear campaign" and said it "[could not] derail us from achieving our noble mission to cope with the negative impacts of climate change."

== Pre-COP29 negotiations ==
At the Climate Change Conference in Bonn in June 2024, despite positive outcomes on the New Collective Quantified Goal (NCQG) and adaptation indicators for COP29, limited progress was achieved on the effective implementation of Article 6 of the Paris Agreement, with unresolved issues surrounding carbon credit systems and emission avoidance. In the occasion, United Nations Climate Change Executive Secretary, Simon Stiell, stressed the need for further work to address those issues before COP29.

In July 2024, Azerbaijan announced the institution of the Climate Finance Action Fund (CFAF), a fund that aimed to seek US$1 billion in annual contributions from fossil fuel-producing countries and companies, which would then be re-invested in renewable energy and support of climate projects in developing countries; half of the resources from the CFAF would reportedly be allocated to national plans for the fulfillment of the targets set by the Paris Agreement. 20% of the total revenues would be allocated to a Rapid Response Funding Facility (2R2F) for disaster support.

On 10 and 11 October, Azerbaijan hosted the annual Pre-COP meeting to initiate discussions ahead of COP29. The conference, centered around the motto "Strengthening Ambitions and Ensuring Action", opened with COP29 President-designate Mukhtar Babayev, COP28 President Sultan Al Jaber, and UN Deputy Secretary-General Amina J. Mohammed. Guests discussed priorities such as the need for a new climate finance goal to replace the former $100 billion target, the full activation of the Loss and Damage Fund —originally established during the COP27 in Sharm El Sheikh—, and wider support of vulnerable communities. Discussions also included updated Nationally Determined Contributions (NDCs) from countries and the finalization of guidelines for carbon markets under Article 6 of the Paris Agreement. Leaders emphasized the need to cap global warming at 1.5°C, as data from the UN Environment Programme had suggested that existing climate pledges may allow for an overall 2.9 °C increase.

== COP29 Organizing Committee ==
The Organising Committee for COP29 was established by an order of the President of Azerbaijan on 13 January 2024. The committee's composition was subsequently expanded on 19 January and 22 February of the same year. Chaired by Samir Nuriyev, Head of the Presidential Administration of Azerbaijan, the committee comprised 56 members, including ministers, members of the National Assembly, and other heads of state authorities.

The organizing committee originally consisted of 28 men. After criticism voiced by several observers, including Executive Secretary of the UN Framework Convention on Climate Change, Christiana Figueres, another two men and eleven women were added to the panel.

== COP29 Presidency ==
Azerbaijan's Minister of Ecology and Natural Resources, Mukhtar Babayev, served as President of the COP29. Babayev previously worked as vice president for ecology at state-owned oil company SOCAR. Other members of the COP29 Presidency Team included Yalchin Rafiyev as the lead negotiator, Deputy Minister of Energy Elnur Soltanov as chief executive officer, Narmin Jarchalova as the Chair of the COP29 Azerbaijan Operating Company and Chief Operating Officer, Nigar Arpadarai as the Climate Change High-Level Champion, and Leyla Hasanova as the Youth Climate Champion.

== Conference agenda ==
COP29 aimed to implement further measures to limit global warming to 1.5 °C, emphasizing the urgent need for investment in climate action. The COP29 Presidency stressed the importance of operationalizing the Loss and Damage Fund to support vulnerable communities, particularly in Small Island Developing States (SIDS) and Least Developed Countries (LDCs), while calling for enhanced Nationally Determined Contributions (NDCs) in line with 1.5 °C targets and urging the submission of national NDCs by 2025, with a focus on fossil fuel phase-out, increasing renewable energy, and addressing non-carbon-dioxide emissions, such as methane. On adaptation, the Presidency called for all countries to prepare and submit their National Adaptation Plans (NAPs) by 2025 and emphasized the need for scaling up adaptation finance. In addition, COP29 encouraged global financial institutions and the private sector to increase climate finance and foster investment in green innovation. The summit aimed to provide platforms to mobilize business participation and enhance transparency in investment decisions to support climate action.

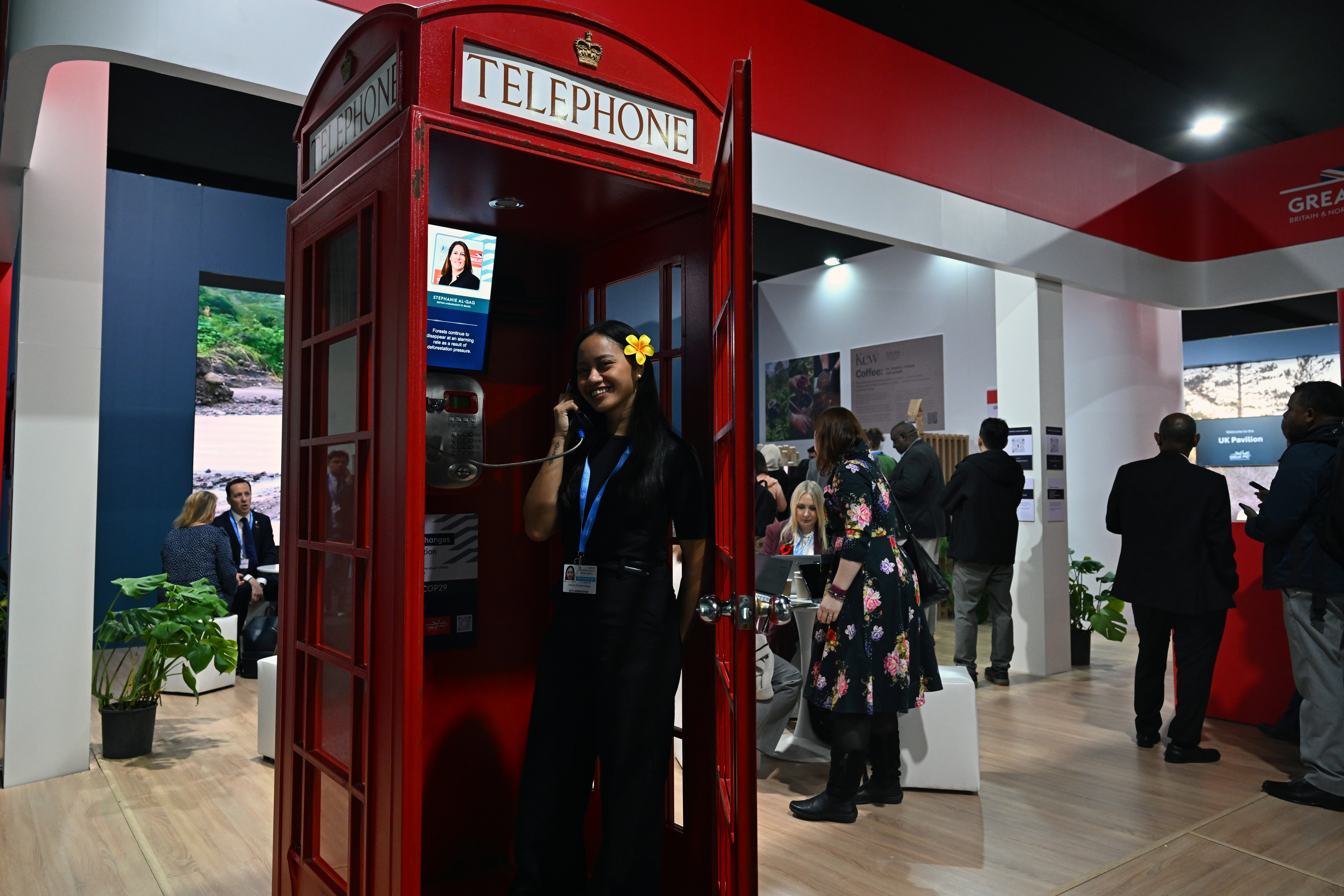
Climate communication

== Venue and zone structure ==
Baku Olympic Stadium in 2015

In April 2024, Azerbaijan announced the Baku Olympic Stadium as the venue for the conference. The city developed a 112,000 m^{2} (1,206,000 sq ft) venue next to the stadium. The event was expected to welcome around 80,000 attendees, including senior government officials at the venue.

COP29 operated within two main zones: the Blue Zone, dedicated to official negotiations among government delegations, international organizations, and selected NGOs, featuring national pavilions where countries presented climate initiatives; and the Green Zone, which was accessible to the public and resembled a trade fair, with corporate exhibitors showcasing climate-related products and services.

== Climate finance ==
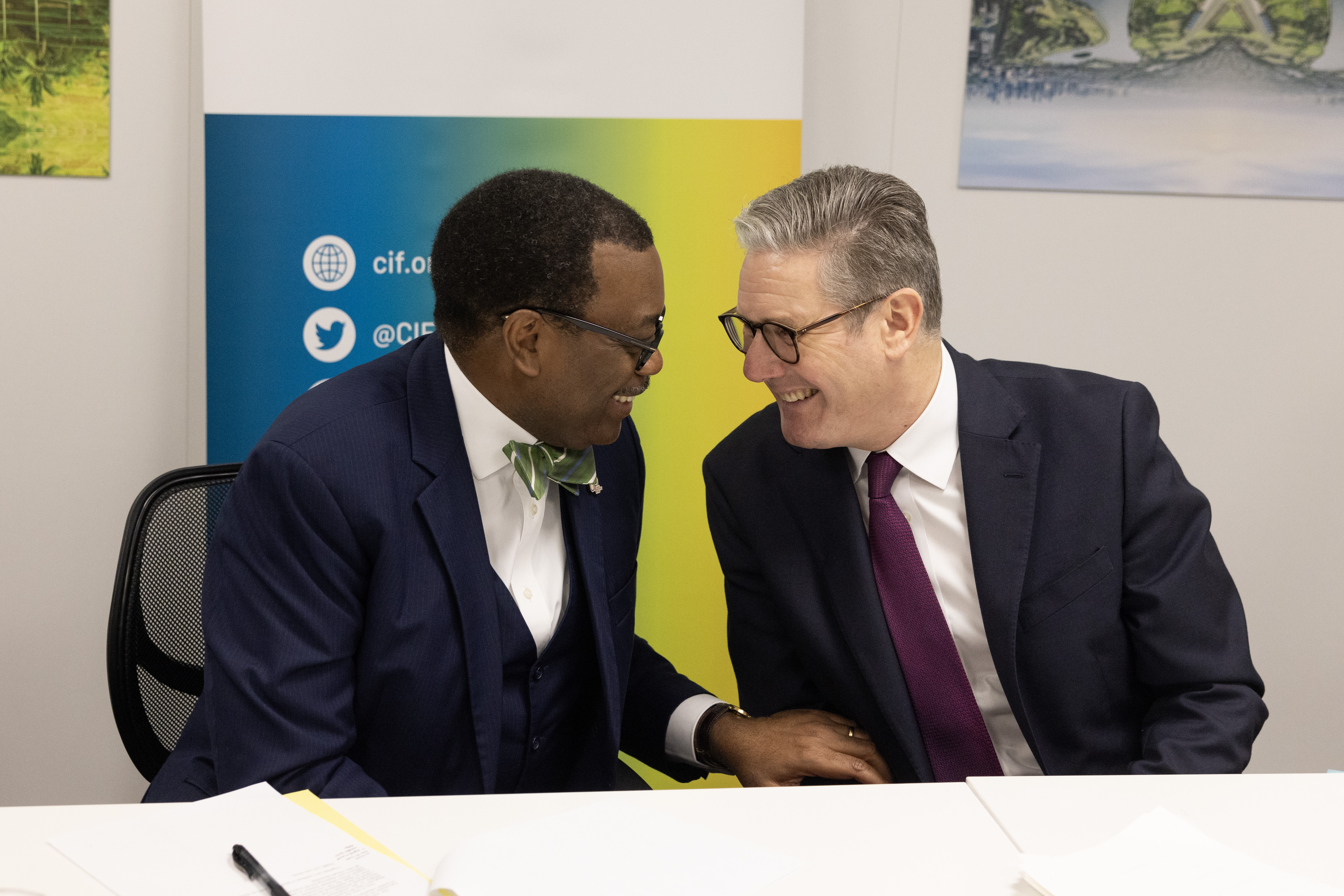
Head of the African Development Bank Akinwumi Adesina chats with UK Prime Minister Keir Starmer

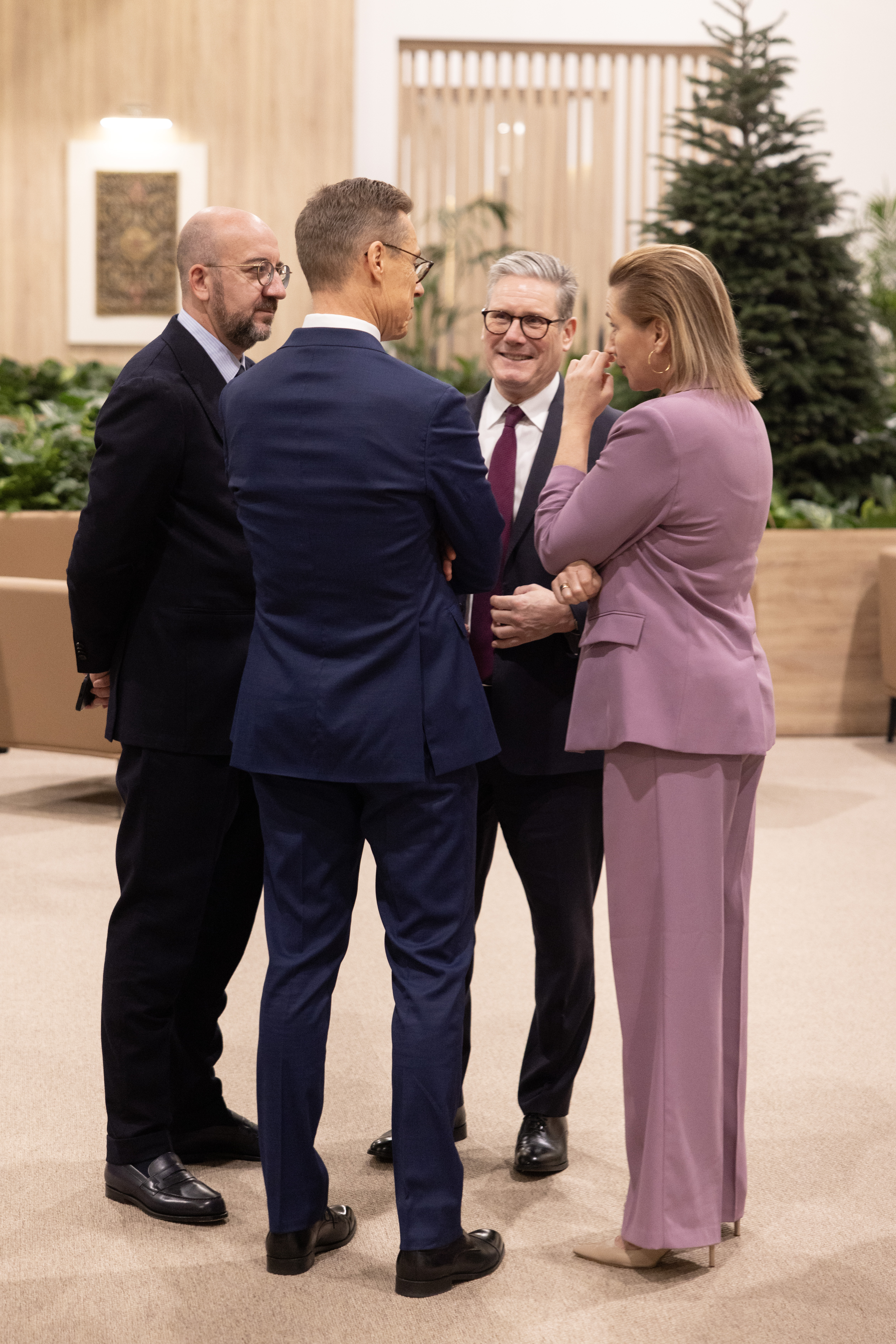
UK Prime Minister Keir Starmer speaks with President of Finland Alexander Stubb, President of the European Council Charles Michel, and Prime Minister of Denmark Mette Frederiksen

At COP29, climate finance was considered to be a central topic, focusing on scaling up resources for developing countries to address climate impacts and transition to low-carbon economies. A key agenda item was the negotiation of the New Collective Quantified Goal (NCQG) on climate finance, which would set a new financial target to support developing countries after 2025, building on the previous $100 billion annual commitment. Proposed solutions included blended finance, which combined public and private investments to amplify funding for climate initiatives, and debt-for-nature swaps, which would allow countries to re-allocate debt repayments toward environmental and climate projects.

Among the major developments, multilateral development banks, including the World Bank and European Investment Bank, pledged to increase climate-related lending to $120 billion annually for low- and middle-income countries, while the Asian Development Bank announced $7.2 billion in additional investments and a $3.5 billion adaptation program targeting glacial melting in Central Asia and the Southern Caucasus. Non-profit investor Acumen pledged $300 million for agricultural adaptation in Africa, Asia, and Latin America, while the Climate Investment Funds launched a $75 billion bond issuance program on the London Stock Exchange. The Association of Banks of Azerbaijan also committed nearly $1.2 billion to support the country's low-carbon transition.

At the conference, world leaders ratified a key framework under Article 6.4 of the Paris Agreement, establishing a UN-backed body to regulate international carbon credit trading. The decision is expected to unlock billions of dollars in climate finance, mainly destined to developing countries.

Delegations also reached an agreement for a deal that would oblige developed nations to make a $300 billion annual climate finance pledge by 2035, in order to help developing countries get access to wider economic resources to tackle emissions and climate disasters. However, poorer nations criticized the amount as insufficient, with many pushing for a minimum $500 billion target. While the deal was seen as a small step, critics, including UN officials, called it a betrayal, especially due to the lack of mandatory contributions for emerging economies like China. This new target builds on the previous $100 billion goal: according to an OECD report published on 21 May 2026, developed countries had provided and mobilised $132.8 billion in 2023 and $136.7 billion in 2024, marking the third consecutive year in which that goal was met.

Key points of tension in the negotiations were the donor base, in which developed economies such as the US and the European Union had insisted that more countries with resources like China and the Gulf Cooperation Council countries should have contributed by default, and the share of funding coming from public budgets, where developing countries had insisted on significant increases in public, non-loan grants. The final $300 billion text stated that climate funding will come from both public and private sources, and encouraged voluntary contributions from developing countries, including China and Middle Eastern countries.

== Energy transition ==
Following COP28 in Dubai, COP29 will focus on advancing the energy transition agenda, with particular emphasis on reducing global reliance on fossil fuels and scaling up renewable energy deployment. Key goals include establishing specific timelines for phasing out coal and developing green hydrogen markets, both of which are critical to achieving the Paris Agreement targets. COP29 will also address energy security concerns, especially for economies heavily dependent on fossil fuels, and will support policies that ensure a just and equitable transition for affected communities.

To facilitate these shifts, COP29 is expected to promote collaborative frameworks that enable countries to share technology, expertise, and resources. This includes regional integration of renewable energy grids, which can improve energy access while reducing emissions. By advancing these initiatives, COP29 seeks to create sustainable, resilient energy systems that align with long-term climate goals.

== Controversies ==
COP29 Chief Executive, Elnur Soltanov, was secretly recorded discussing potential oil and gas deals during the conference, raising serious concerns about a breach of COP ethics. Critics argued that Soltanov's behavior undermined the conference's goal of transitioning away from fossil fuels, as Soltanov also held a key role in Azerbaijan's energy sector.

EU diplomats criticized Azerbaijan for not putting fossil fuel phase-out on the agenda of the conference, which solely mentioned mitigation. On 31 October 2024, Papua New Guinea's Minister of Foreign Affairs, Justin Tkatchenko, announced that the country would boycott the summit entirely, calling it a "total waste of time". Most G7 heads of government chose not to attend the summit, with the exception of Italy and the United Kingdom.

In October 2024, Human Rights Watch revealed the HCA between the UN and Azerbaijan, which had been signed in August. Although the COP29 HCA was made public prior to the climate conference, unlike COP28, it was described as "disappointing, but not surprising." HRW said the HCA was full of "significant shortcomings and ambiguities on the protections for participants' rights". The agreement was released alongside HRW's report exposing the efforts of Azerbaijan's government to "silence its critics", where several activists and journalists were arrested on baseless and serious criminal charges.

On 14 November 2024, the UN was forced to respond to complaints about the lack of vegan, vegetarian and plant-based food options at the COP29. Reportedly only a single food stall in the event's food court sold vegan options, whereas the majority of food stalls, including a Domino's Pizza, sold meat-based meals. In response to the controversy, vegan campaigners handed out free sandwiches.

On 15 November 2024, the Kick Big Polluters Out (KBPO) coalition, which included Global Witness, Corporate Accountability, and Corporate Europe Observatory, reported that at least 1,773 fossil fuel lobbyists were granted access to the COP29 climate summit in Baku, surpassing the size of nearly each national delegation, except for Azerbaijan (2,229), Brazil (1,914), and Turkey (1,862). According to the KBPO, the report highlighted the "disproportionate presence" of industry representatives in comparison to delegates from the ten most climate-vulnerable nations, which had collectively sent 1,033 participants.

On 23 November 2024, The Guardian revealed that a Saudi Arabian delegate had allegedly tried to modify an official negotiating text, a type of document that was usually circulated as non-editable PDF by COP presidencies to all countries simultaneously.

The campaign website cop29.com was purchased by Global Witness instead of Azerbaijan's COP29 team and became a focal point of controversy. Backed by notable figures such as actor Jude Law and former UN climate chief Mary Robinson, the site advocated for fossil fuel companies to fund climate damages, highlighting their $4 trillion earnings in 2022 compared to the $702 million pledged at the summit. The website was banned at the summit venue, and, according to the Financial Times, Azerbaijan blocked domestic access to the site in what was described as a "fossil fuel domain name war," intensifying debates over the influence of fossil fuel interests in the COP process.

Frank Pallone recounted an alarming encounter during his visit to the UN-led climate conference in Baku. He was confronted by hostile, coordinated questions from local media, which he believed were orchestrated by the Azerbaijani government to intimidate him. He accused the Azerbaijani government of repressing free speech and using the event to deflect criticism of its human rights record. Ed Markey also faced harassment, calling out Azerbaijan for "greenwashing" its climate and human rights record. Both lawmakers criticized the country's treatment of political prisoners and its stance on negotiations with Armenia.

On 7 November 2025 the British newspaper The Guardian revealed how more than 5,000 fossil fuel lobbyists were given access to the UN climate summits over four years, including COP29.

== See also ==
- 2024 in climate change
- Climate change in Azerbaijan
