= Climate of Azerbaijan =

Köppen-Geiger climate classification

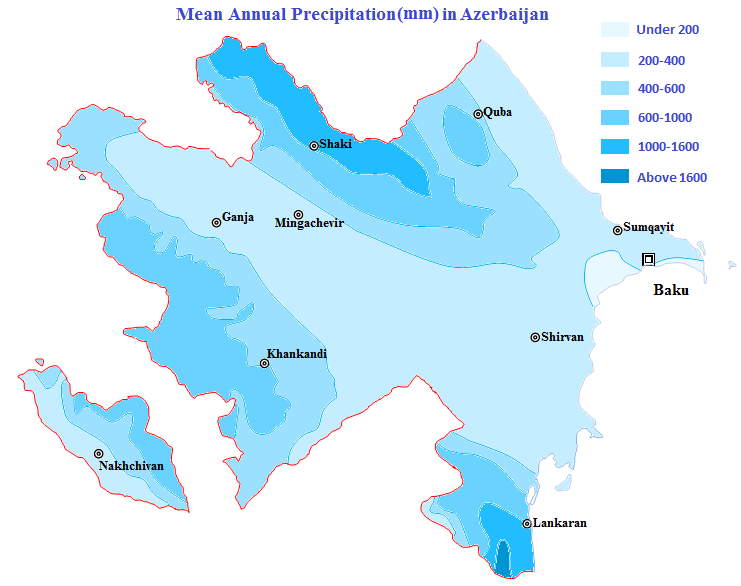
Mean annual precipitation in Azerbaijan (mm)

The climate of Azerbaijan is very diverse. Nine out of eleven existing climate zones are present in Azerbaijan.

== Geography ==
Azerbaijan is situated at the northern extremity of the subtropical zone, in the southeastern part of the Caucasus and the northwestern part of the Iranian plateau. The complicated geographical location and landscape, the proximity of the Caspian Sea, the effect of the sun's radiation, and air masses of different origin, etc., contribute to its climatological diversity.

=== Landscape ===
As a predominantly mountainous country, Azerbaijan is surrounded by the Greater Caucasus, Lesser Caucasus, Talysh, and North Iranian Mountains. The Kur-Araz Lowland, located between the Greater and Lesser Caucasus, stretches to the Caspian Sea in the eastern part of the country. The Greater Caucasus, situated in the north of the country and stretching from the northwest to the southeast, protects the country from the direct influences of northern cold air masses. This leads to the formation of a subtropical climate on most of the foothills and plains of the country. Other mountain chains surrounding the country also impact air circulation. The complexity of the landscape causes a nonuniform formation of climatic zones and creates vertical climate zones.

=== Solar radiation ===
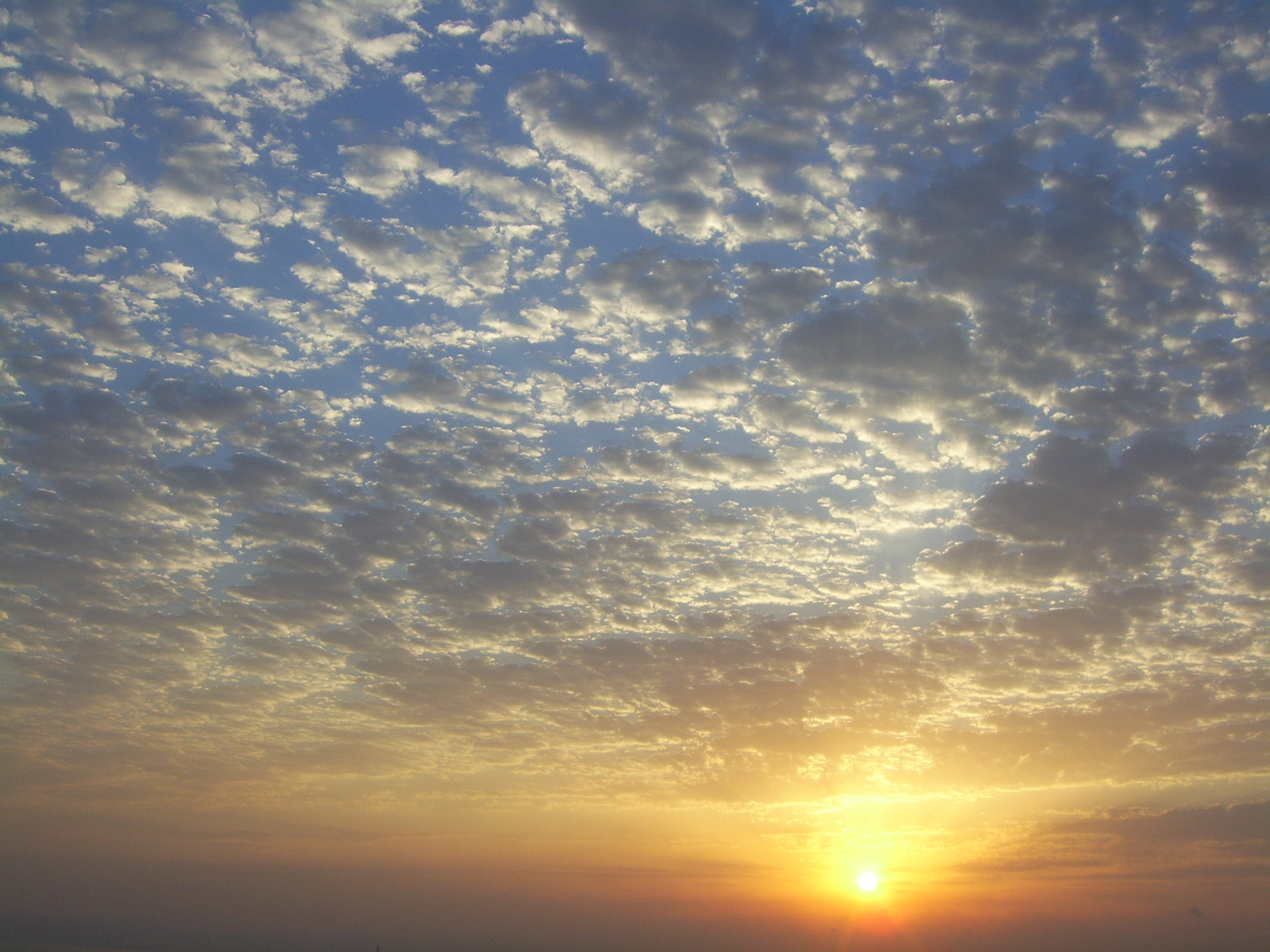
Sunsets in Azerbaijan are often very colorful.

The Azerbaijani plains and foothills have high insolation rates. The sun shines for 2,200 to 2,400 hours annually on the Kur-Araz lowland, Apsheron peninsula and other plains and foothills, and 2,600 to 2,800 hours on the plains around the Araz river in the Nakhchivan region. Due to increased cloudiness in the mountainous regions, those areas receive only 1,900 to 2,200 hours of direct sunlight.

Bright sunlight shines 2,200 to 2,500 hours a year at altitudes over 3,000 meters (9,800 ft). The total annual radiation equals 128–132 kcal/cm^{2} (118–122 kWh/ft^{2}). Toward the mountains, it declines to 120–124 kcal/cm^{2} (109–113 kWh/ft^{2}), at an altitude of 500 to 600 meters (1,600 to 2,000 ft) above sea level, then gradually increases and reaches 140–150 kcal/cm^{2} (129–139 kWh/ft^{2}) at altitudes above 3,000 meters (9,800 ft) in the Greater and Lesser Caucasus.

The total amount of solar radiation affecting the Araz plains in Nakhchivan totals 148–150 kcal/cm^{2} (137–139 kWh/ft^{2}). It increases in the mountains, reaching 152–160 kcal/cm^{2} (140–148 kWh/ft^{2}). The solar radiation on the country's plains and foothills amounts to 40–50 kcal/cm^{2} (37–46 kWh/ft^{2}); in Lenkoran, 50–60 kcal/cm^{2} (46–55 kWh/ft^{2}); in the mountains, 15–25 kcal/cm^{2} (14–23 kWh/ft^{2}).

=== Circulation of air masses ===
Climate formation in Azerbaijan is influenced by various air masses. Cold air masses, such as the Kara and Scandinavian Arctic Anticyclones, the temperate Siberian anticyclones, and the maritime Azores maximum, influence the climate. Likewise, tropical hot air masses (subtropical anticyclone and southern cyclones), as well as Central Asian anticyclones and local weather conditions, have an influence. These air masses enter the country in different ways, thanks to its varied geography. Thus, although they do not prevent the hot masses from entering Azerbaijan from the south, cold continental and maritime air masses cause changes in the properties of those hot air masses, and influence the dynamics of the atmosphere .

== Major aspects ==
Some of the major influences on Azerbaijan's climate are temperature, precipitation, humidity, rate of evaporation, and cloud cover.

=== Temperature ===
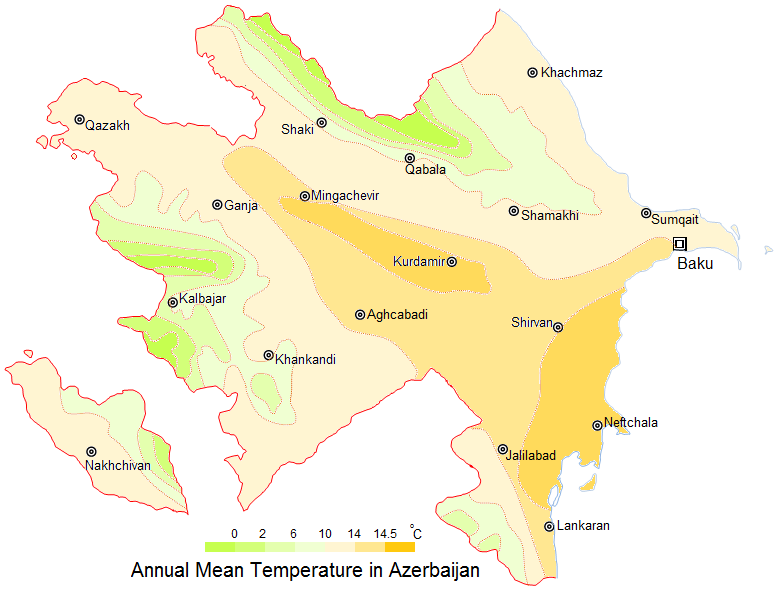
Mean annual temperature in Azerbaijan (°C)

The temperature regime and its distribution throughout Azerbaijan is regular and depends on the features of air masses entering the country, the regional landscape, and proximity to the Caspian Sea. The sea causes temperatures in the maritime areas (20 kilometres or 12 miles away from the sea) to decline in the summer and rise in the winter. At the same time, the sea moderates the influence of hot and dry air masses coming from Central Asia. The average annual temperature is 14–15 °C (57–59 °F) in the Kur-Araz Lowland, the coastal regions south of the Apsheron Peninsula, and in the Lenkoran Lowland. The temperature declines with proximity to the mountains, averaging 4–5 °C (39–41 °F) at an altitude of 2,000 meters (6,600 ft) and 1–2 °C (34–36 °F) at 3,000 meters (9,800 ft).

Both the absolute minimum temperature (−33 °C or −27.4 °F) and the absolute maximum temperature (46 °C or 114.8 °F) were observed in Julfa and Ordubad.

==== Examples ====
Climate data for Baku
| Month | Jan | Feb | Mar | Apr | May | Jun | Jul | Aug | Sep | Oct | Nov | Dec | Year |
|---|---|---|---|---|---|---|---|---|---|---|---|---|---|
| Record high °C (°F) | 20.4 (68.7) | 21.8 (71.2) | 27.8 (82.0) | 27.8 (82.0) | 35.0 (95.0) | 40.5 (104.9) | 42.7 (108.9) | 41.9 (107.4) | 39.4 (102.9) | 30.1 (86.2) | 25.0 (77.0) | 26.0 (78.8) | 42.7 (108.9) |
| Mean daily maximum °C (°F) | 6.6 (43.9) | 6.3 (43.3) | 9.8 (49.6) | 16.4 (61.5) | 22.1 (71.8) | 27.3 (81.1) | 30.6 (87.1) | 29.7 (85.5) | 25.6 (78.1) | 19.6 (67.3) | 13.5 (56.3) | 9.7 (49.5) | 18.1 (64.6) |
| Daily mean °C (°F) | 4.4 (39.9) | 4.2 (39.6) | 7.0 (44.6) | 12.9 (55.2) | 18.5 (65.3) | 23.5 (74.3) | 26.4 (79.5) | 26.3 (79.3) | 22.5 (72.5) | 16.6 (61.9) | 11.2 (52.2) | 7.3 (45.1) | 15.1 (59.2) |
| Mean daily minimum °C (°F) | 2.1 (35.8) | 2.0 (35.6) | 4.2 (39.6) | 9.4 (48.9) | 14.9 (58.8) | 19.7 (67.5) | 22.2 (72.0) | 22.9 (73.2) | 19.4 (66.9) | 13.6 (56.5) | 8.8 (47.8) | 4.8 (40.6) | 12.0 (53.6) |
| Record low °C (°F) | −13.7 (7.3) | −8.4 (16.9) | −7.0 (19.4) | −6.1 (21.0) | 0.2 (32.4) | 10.0 (50.0) | 11.2 (52.2) | 11.9 (53.4) | 9.1 (48.4) | 1.2 (34.2) | −2.8 (27.0) | −5.5 (22.1) | −13.7 (7.3) |
| Average precipitation mm (inches) | 21 (0.8) | 20 (0.8) | 21 (0.8) | 18 (0.7) | 18 (0.7) | 8 (0.3) | 2 (0.1) | 6 (0.2) | 15 (0.6) | 25 (1.0) | 30 (1.2) | 26 (1.0) | 210 (8.3) |
| Average precipitation days (≥ 0.1 mm) | 6 | 6 | 5 | 4 | 3 | 2 | 1 | 2 | 2 | 6 | 6 | 6 | 49 |
| Average snowy days (≥ 1 cm) | 4 | 3 | 0 | 0 | 0 | 0 | 0 | 0 | 0 | 0 | 0 | 3 | 10 |
| Mean monthly sunshine hours | 89.9 | 89.0 | 124.0 | 195.0 | 257.3 | 294.0 | 313.1 | 282.1 | 222.0 | 145.7 | 93.0 | 102.3 | 2,207.4 |
Source 1: World Meteorological Organisation (UN), Hong Kong Observatory for data of sunshine hours
Source 2: Meoweather (Snowy days) infoclimat.fr (extremes)

Climate data for Nakhchivan
| Month | Jan | Feb | Mar | Apr | May | Jun | Jul | Aug | Sep | Oct | Nov | Dec | Year |
|---|---|---|---|---|---|---|---|---|---|---|---|---|---|
| Mean daily maximum °C (°F) | 0.8 (33.4) | 4.0 (39.2) | 12.3 (54.1) | 20.1 (68.2) | 24.7 (76.5) | 29.5 (85.1) | 34.7 (94.5) | 33.7 (92.7) | 30.1 (86.2) | 21.9 (71.4) | 12.6 (54.7) | 5.1 (41.2) | 19.1 (66.4) |
| Daily mean °C (°F) | −4.0 (24.8) | −0.5 (31.1) | 5.4 (41.7) | 12.4 (54.3) | 17.5 (63.5) | 22.4 (72.3) | 26.9 (80.4) | 26.2 (79.2) | 21.9 (71.4) | 14.1 (57.4) | 6.5 (43.7) | 0.9 (33.6) | 12.5 (54.5) |
| Mean daily minimum °C (°F) | −6.8 (19.8) | −4.3 (24.3) | 1.0 (33.8) | 7.4 (45.3) | 11.5 (52.7) | 15.9 (60.6) | 20.0 (68.0) | 18.7 (65.7) | 14.7 (58.5) | 8.2 (46.8) | 2.3 (36.1) | −2.5 (27.5) | 7.2 (45.0) |
| Average precipitation mm (inches) | 19 (0.7) | 18 (0.7) | 29 (1.1) | 38 (1.5) | 36 (1.4) | 30 (1.2) | 17 (0.7) | 8 (0.3) | 11 (0.4) | 26 (1.0) | 20 (0.8) | 15 (0.6) | 267 (10.5) |
| Average precipitation days | 5 | 4 | 6 | 7 | 9 | 5 | 2 | 2 | 2 | 5 | 4 | 4 | 55 |
| Mean monthly sunshine hours | 82.9 | 117.3 | 188.3 | 202.6 | 254.5 | 324.0 | 364.4 | 338.7 | 302.5 | 215.6 | 148.1 | 121.1 | 2,660 |
Source: NOAA

Climate data for Ganja (1981–2010, extremes 1890–2014)
| Month | Jan | Feb | Mar | Apr | May | Jun | Jul | Aug | Sep | Oct | Nov | Dec | Year |
|---|---|---|---|---|---|---|---|---|---|---|---|---|---|
| Record high °C (°F) | 22.8 (73.0) | 25.0 (77.0) | 28.0 (82.4) | 35.6 (96.1) | 39.5 (103.1) | 39.2 (102.6) | 42.0 (107.6) | 41.7 (107.1) | 38.8 (101.8) | 33.4 (92.1) | 28.0 (82.4) | 23.3 (73.9) | 42.0 (107.6) |
| Mean daily maximum °C (°F) | 7.0 (44.6) | 8.2 (46.8) | 12.7 (54.9) | 18.7 (65.7) | 23.4 (74.1) | 28.7 (83.7) | 31.6 (88.9) | 31.1 (88.0) | 26.3 (79.3) | 19.5 (67.1) | 12.9 (55.2) | 8.4 (47.1) | 19.0 (66.2) |
| Daily mean °C (°F) | 3.2 (37.8) | 3.9 (39.0) | 7.8 (46.0) | 13.4 (56.1) | 18.1 (64.6) | 23.2 (73.8) | 26.2 (79.2) | 25.6 (78.1) | 21.1 (70.0) | 15.0 (59.0) | 8.9 (48.0) | 4.7 (40.5) | 14.3 (57.7) |
| Mean daily minimum °C (°F) | 0.5 (32.9) | 1.0 (33.8) | 4.3 (39.7) | 9.4 (48.9) | 13.8 (56.8) | 18.6 (65.5) | 21.4 (70.5) | 21.0 (69.8) | 16.8 (62.2) | 11.6 (52.9) | 6.2 (43.2) | 2.1 (35.8) | 10.6 (51.1) |
| Record low °C (°F) | −17.8 (0.0) | −15.2 (4.6) | −12.0 (10.4) | −4.4 (24.1) | 1.5 (34.7) | 5.8 (42.4) | 10.1 (50.2) | 10.5 (50.9) | 2.8 (37.0) | −1.3 (29.7) | −7.9 (17.8) | −13.0 (8.6) | −17.8 (0.0) |
| Average precipitation mm (inches) | 8 (0.3) | 12 (0.5) | 24 (0.9) | 31 (1.2) | 40 (1.6) | 32 (1.3) | 17 (0.7) | 15 (0.6) | 15 (0.6) | 24 (0.9) | 16 (0.6) | 7 (0.3) | 241 (9.5) |
| Average precipitation days (≥ 0.1 mm) | 7.0 | 7.0 | 8.0 | 8.2 | 9.0 | 7.0 | 4.0 | 3.0 | 4.0 | 6.3 | 6.5 | 6.0 | 76.0 |
| Average rainy days | 3 | 4 | 6 | 8 | 9 | 6 | 4 | 3 | 4 | 6 | 6 | 4 | 63 |
| Average snowy days | 3 | 5 | 2 | 0.2 | 0 | 0 | 0 | 0 | 0 | 0.4 | 1 | 2 | 14 |
| Average relative humidity (%) | 71 | 71 | 68 | 70 | 68 | 61 | 59 | 61 | 65 | 74 | 76 | 74 | 68 |
| Mean monthly sunshine hours | 120 | 113 | 141 | 182 | 229 | 267 | 278 | 252 | 212 | 168 | 123 | 115 | 2,200 |
Source 1: Deutscher Wetterdienst (sun, 1961-1990) (Note: Station ID for Gandja is 37735 Use this station ID to locate the sunshine duration)
Source 2: Pogoda.ru.net

Climate data for Lenkaran
| Month | Jan | Feb | Mar | Apr | May | Jun | Jul | Aug | Sep | Oct | Nov | Dec | Year |
|---|---|---|---|---|---|---|---|---|---|---|---|---|---|
| Mean daily maximum °C (°F) | 7.2 (45.0) | 7.2 (45.0) | 11.0 (51.8) | 17.5 (63.5) | 22.5 (72.5) | 27.2 (81.0) | 30.4 (86.7) | 29.5 (85.1) | 25.9 (78.6) | 19.9 (67.8) | 14.1 (57.4) | 10.1 (50.2) | 18.5 (65.4) |
| Mean daily minimum °C (°F) | 0.0 (32.0) | 1.0 (33.8) | 3.9 (39.0) | 8.6 (47.5) | 13.1 (55.6) | 17.5 (63.5) | 20.1 (68.2) | 19.7 (67.5) | 16.9 (62.4) | 11.8 (53.2) | 6.7 (44.1) | 2.5 (36.5) | 10.2 (50.3) |
| Average precipitation mm (inches) | 91 (3.6) | 114 (4.5) | 90 (3.5) | 50 (2.0) | 54 (2.1) | 22 (0.9) | 17 (0.7) | 50 (2.0) | 143 (5.6) | 259 (10.2) | 168 (6.6) | 88 (3.5) | 1,146 (45.2) |
| Average precipitation days | 10 | 10 | 11 | 8 | 8 | 3 | 2 | 4 | 7 | 13 | 12 | 9 | 97 |
| Mean monthly sunshine hours | 105.4 | 98.9 | 124.0 | 171.0 | 226.3 | 282.0 | 306.9 | 254.2 | 189.0 | 127.1 | 99.0 | 108.5 | 2,092.3 |
Source 1: World Meteorological Organization (UN)
Source 2: Hong Kong Observatory(sun only)

Climate data for Mingachevir
| Month | Jan | Feb | Mar | Apr | May | Jun | Jul | Aug | Sep | Oct | Nov | Dec | Year |
|---|---|---|---|---|---|---|---|---|---|---|---|---|---|
| Mean daily maximum °C (°F) | 7.1 (44.8) | 8.6 (47.5) | 12.9 (55.2) | 20.9 (69.6) | 26.0 (78.8) | 30.0 (86.0) | 33.9 (93.0) | 32.6 (90.7) | 28.4 (83.1) | 21.0 (69.8) | 14.4 (57.9) | 9.3 (48.7) | 20.4 (68.8) |
| Mean daily minimum °C (°F) | −4.0 (24.8) | −3.0 (26.6) | 4.0 (39.2) | 9.3 (48.7) | 14.2 (57.6) | 18.6 (65.5) | 21.6 (70.9) | 20.6 (69.1) | 17.0 (62.6) | 11.1 (52.0) | 6.2 (43.2) | 1.4 (34.5) | 9.8 (49.6) |
| Average precipitation mm (inches) | 19 (0.7) | 25 (1.0) | 27 (1.1) | 39 (1.5) | 54 (2.1) | 49 (1.9) | 26 (1.0) | 27 (1.1) | 26 (1.0) | 53 (2.1) | 30 (1.2) | 22 (0.9) | 397 (15.6) |
Source: Climate-Data.org

Climate data for Khankendi
| Month | Jan | Feb | Mar | Apr | May | Jun | Jul | Aug | Sep | Oct | Nov | Dec | Year |
|---|---|---|---|---|---|---|---|---|---|---|---|---|---|
| Mean daily maximum °C (°F) | 4.7 (40.5) | 5.2 (41.4) | 9.0 (48.2) | 16.1 (61.0) | 19.5 (67.1) | 24.5 (76.1) | 28.1 (82.6) | 27.1 (80.8) | 23.2 (73.8) | 16.4 (61.5) | 11.4 (52.5) | 7.3 (45.1) | 16.0 (60.9) |
| Daily mean °C (°F) | 1.1 (34.0) | 1.4 (34.5) | 5.1 (41.2) | 11.6 (52.9) | 15.3 (59.5) | 19.8 (67.6) | 23.3 (73.9) | 22.3 (72.1) | 18.7 (65.7) | 12.6 (54.7) | 7.7 (45.9) | 3.7 (38.7) | 11.9 (53.4) |
| Mean daily minimum °C (°F) | −2.6 (27.3) | −2.5 (27.5) | 1.1 (34.0) | 7.0 (44.6) | 11.0 (51.8) | 15.1 (59.2) | 18.4 (65.1) | 17.4 (63.3) | 14.2 (57.6) | 8.7 (47.7) | 4.0 (39.2) | 0.1 (32.2) | 7.7 (45.8) |
| Average precipitation mm (inches) | 19 (0.7) | 25 (1.0) | 42 (1.7) | 49 (1.9) | 102 (4.0) | 79 (3.1) | 41 (1.6) | 27 (1.1) | 34 (1.3) | 39 (1.5) | 35 (1.4) | 13 (0.5) | 505 (19.9) |
| Average precipitation days | 6 | 6 | 10 | 10 | 14 | 10 | 4 | 4 | 6 | 6 | 5 | 4 | 85 |
Source: NOAA

=== Precipitation ===
The maximum annual precipitation falls in Lankaran (1,600 to 1,800 mm or 63 to 71 in) and the minimum in the Absheron Peninsula (200 to 350 mm or 7.9 to 13.8 in).

== Climate types ==
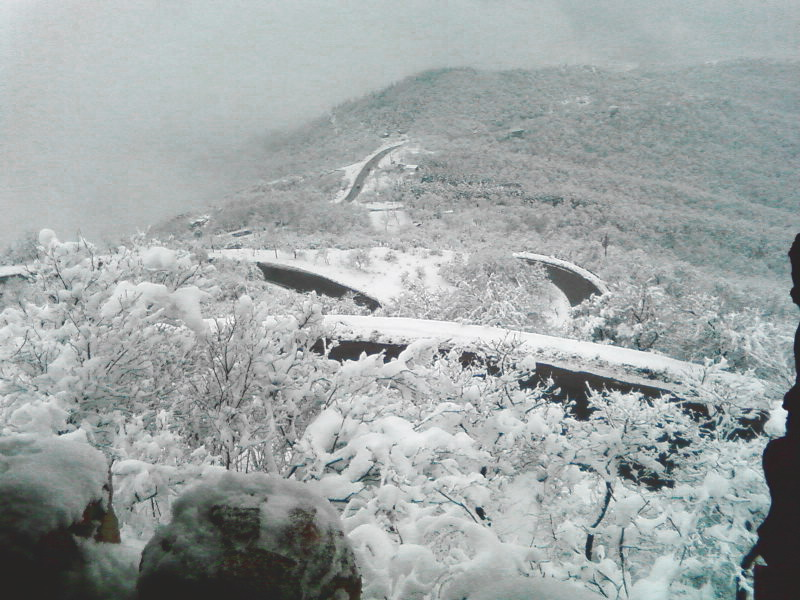
Winter in the Shamakhi District

Considering the distribution and features of the weather, temperature, humidity, and precipitation, nine out of the 11 climate patterns in the Köppen climate classification can be found in Azerbaijan. Many of these patterns are divided into subtypes.

- Semi-desert and dry steppe climates cover the central lowlands in the Kur up to 400 meters (1,300 ft), the Caspian zone from the end of the Samur River to the Gizilagaj Gulf, the plains of Nakhchivan along the Araz River, and the valleys of the Talish Mountains below 1,000 meters (3,300 ft). Annual precipitation accounts for 15 to 50 percent of the possible evaporation. Winters are usually cool (though cold on the Araz River plains and in the valleys of, the Talish Mountains). Summers can become very hot, sometimes exceeding 40 °C (104 °F).
- Semi-desert and dry steppe climate with cold winter and dry hot summers .
- A moderate climate with mild, dry winters covers the Southern hills (below 1,000 metres or 3,300 feet) of the Greater Caucasus, the Ganikh-Eyrichay valley between 200 and 500 meters (660 and 1,640 ft), and the northern and eastern hills of the Lesser Caucasus between 400 and 1,500 meters (1,300 and 4,900 ft). Annual precipitation accounts for 50 to 100 percent of the possible evaporation in this climate zone.
- A moderately warm climate with dry summers covers the Lankaran-Astara region. Annual precipitation accounts for 100 to 150 percent or more of the possible evaporation. Winters are cool, summers are hot and dry, and autumns are rainy. The period from May through August is usually dry, requiring artificial irrigation.
- Cold, dry winters cover the southeast hills of the Greater Caucasus between 1,000 and 2,700 meters (3,300 and 8,900 ft), and mountainous regions of the Lesser Caucasus between 1,400 and 2,700 meters (4,600 and 8,900 ft). Annual precipitation accounts for 75 to 100 percent of the possible evaporation. Summers are cool and winter is mild.
- A cold climate with cool, dry summers covers the middle and high mountains of Nakhchivan AR between 1,000 and 3,000 meters (3,300 and 9,800 ft). Annual precipitation accounts for 50 to 100 percent of possible evaporation. Summers are cool, and winter is cold enough for snow.
- A moderate climate with equal distribution of rainfall covers the mountainous forests in the south between 600 and 1,500 meters (2,000 and 4,900 ft), and the northeast hills of the Greater Caucasus between 200 and 500 meters (660 and 1,640 ft). Annual rainfall accounts for 75 to 100 percent of the possible evaporation in the south hills, and 50 to 100 percent in the northeast hills. Winters are cool, summers warm.
- A cold climate with heavy precipitation year-round occurs in the south hills of the Greater Caucasus between 1,500 and 2,700 meters (4,900 and 8,900 ft), which include forest, subalpine, and alpine zones. Annual precipitation accounts for more than 150 to 200 percent of the possible evaporation. Winters are cold, summers cool.
- Alpine tundra covers the areas of the Greater and Lesser Caucasus above 2,700 meters (8,900 ft), and Nakhchivan above 3,200 meters (10,500 ft). Annual precipitation accounts for more than 100 to 200 percent of the possible evaporation. Winters and summers are both cold. In some places, the snow does not melt until the following winter.

== Climate change ==
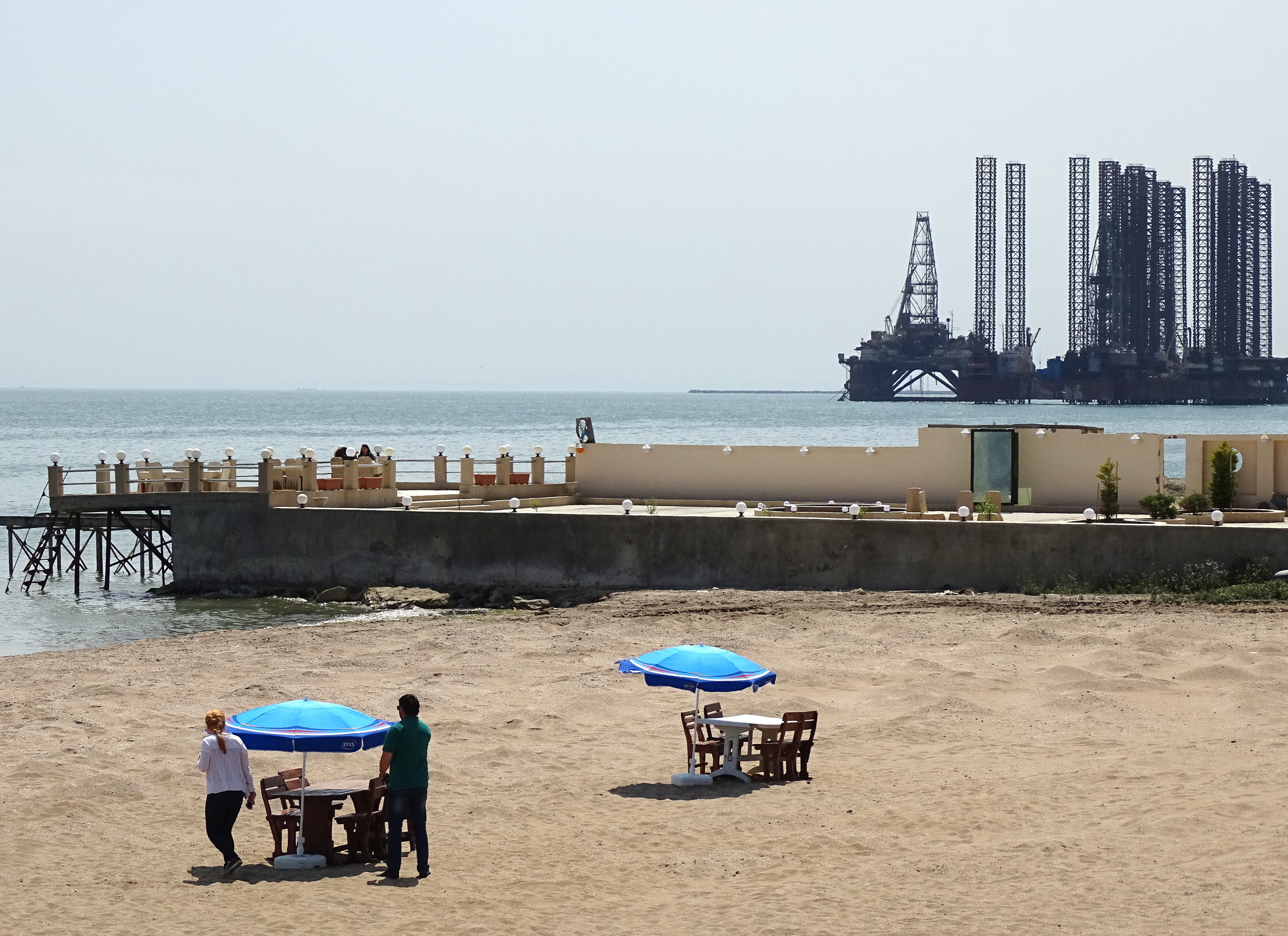
Greenhouse gas emissions are mostly from oil and gas

Köppen climate classification map for Azerbaijan for 1980–2016

2071–2100 map under the most intense climate change scenario. Mid-range scenarios are currently considered more likely

Climate change has had serious consequences in Azerbaijan since the start of the 21st century. The climate of Azerbaijan was 1.3 degrees hotter by 2010. The Caspian Sea is shrinking. Azerbaijan will host the 2024 United Nations Climate Change Conference, known as COP29.

== See also ==
- Geography of Azerbaijan
- Nature of Azerbaijan
