= 2024 in climate change =

This article documents events, research findings, scientific and technological advances, and human actions to measure, predict, mitigate, and adapt to the effects of global warming and climate change—during the year 2024.

== Summaries ==
2023–2024 as a turning point

When our children and grandchildren look back at the history of human-made climate change, this year and next [2024] will be seen as the turning point at which the futility of governments in dealing with climate change was finally exposed.

— James Hansen, December 2023
Director (1981-2013) of NASA's
Goddard Institute for Space Studies

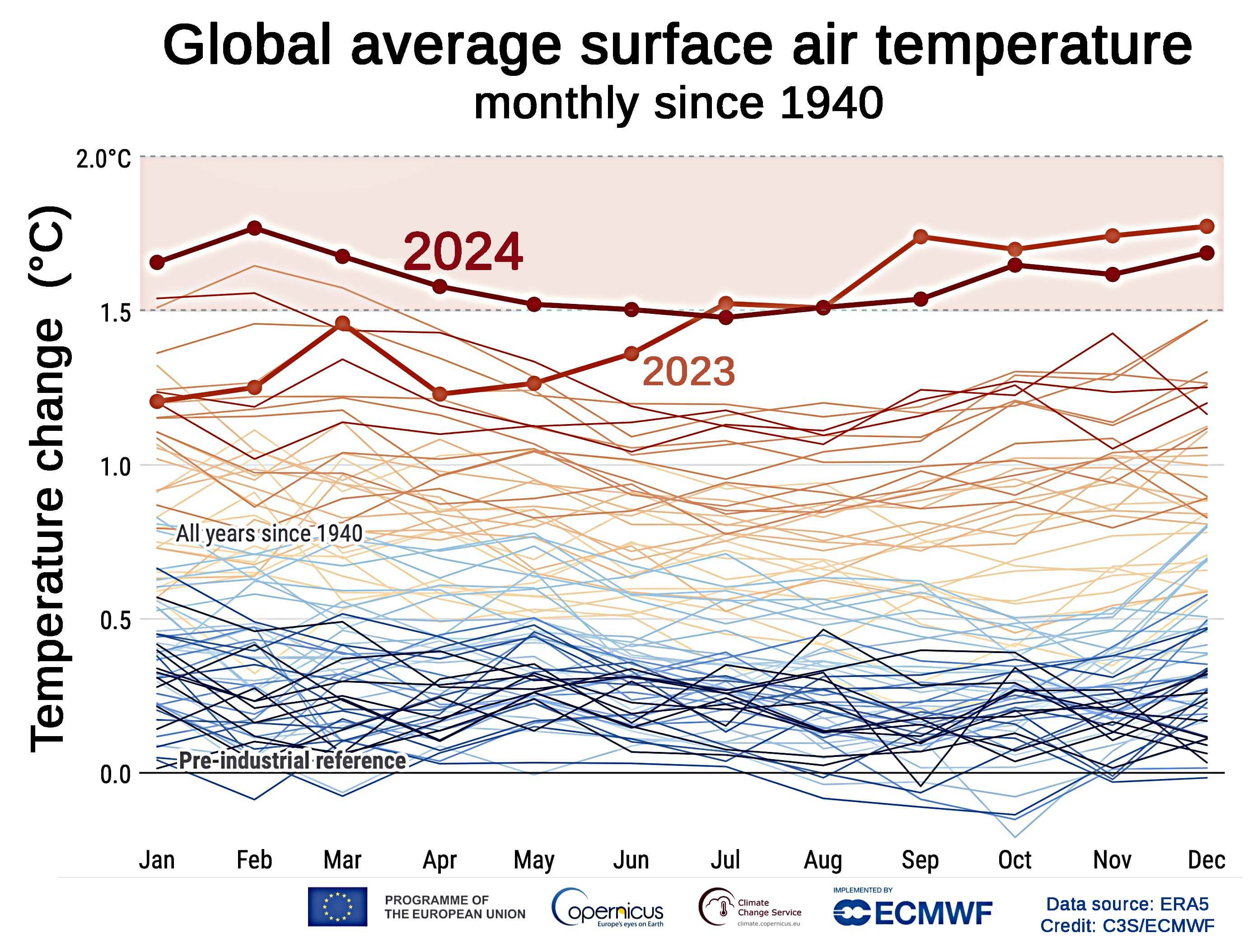
In 2024, Earth saw the highest average annual surface air temperature ever recorded, outpacing 2023 on an average basis.

- 19 March: "The climate crisis is the defining challenge that humanity faces and is closely intertwined with the inequality crisis, as witnessed by growing food insecurity and population displacement, and biodiversity loss." —Prof. Celeste Saulo, Secretary-General of the World Meteorological Organization, in State of the Climate 2023.
- October: "For the first time in human history, the hydrological cycle is out of balance, undermining an equitable and sustainable future for all."
- 12 November: At the COP29 conference, U.N. Secretary General António Guterres described 2024 as a "master class in climate destruction.
- 7 April 2025: a study published in npj Climate and Atmospheric Science found that the climate extremes of 2023–2024 were exceptional even compared to recent warming trends, with record-breaking global surface air and sea surface temperatures. The research attributes these extremes to a combination of a positive decadal trend in Earth's Energy Imbalance, three consecutive years of La Niña, and a rapid transition to El Niño, resulting in over 75% more heating between 2022 and 2023 than during similar past events. The authors warn that if the current trend in Earth's energy accumulation continues, natural climate fluctuations like ENSO will increasingly produce amplified, record-breaking impacts in the future.

== Measurements and statistics ==
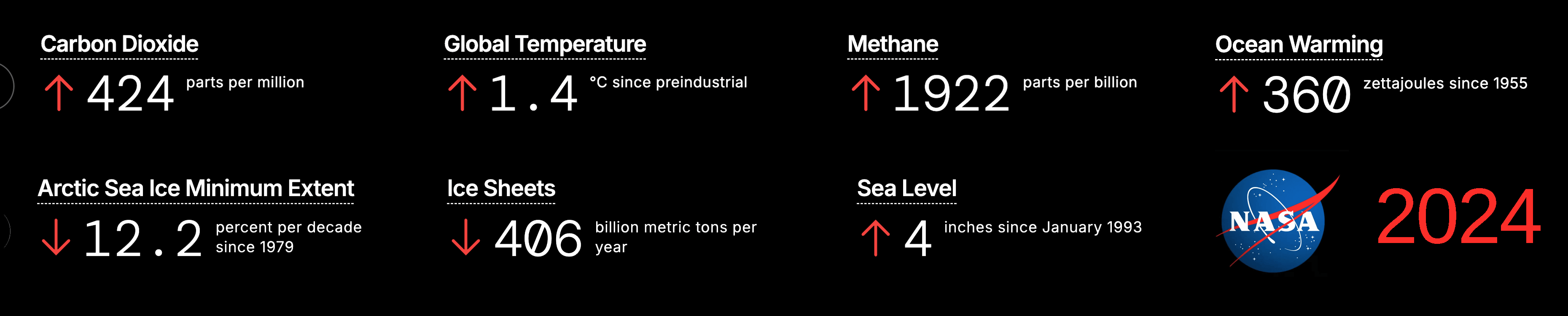
"Vital Signs of the Planet" as presented by NASA on 31 December 2024
- 5 February: a study published in the Proceedings of the National Academy of Sciences proposed adding a "Category 6" to the Saffir–Simpson hurricane wind scale to adequately convey storms' risk to the public, the researchers noting a number of storms have already achieved that intensity.
- 5 February: a study published in Nature Climate Change, based on 300 years of ocean mixed-layer temperature records preserved in sclerosponge skeletons, concluded that modern global warming began in the 1860s (over 80 years earlier than indicated by sea surface temperature records) and was already 1.7 °C above pre-industrial levels by 2020—a figure 0.5 °C higher than IPCC estimates.

The 2024 hurricane season saw an early flareup of activity including the earliest Category 5 storm on record, an unusual mid-season pause, and a final flareup to end the season.

- February (reported): a Copernicus Climate Change Service analysis indicated that from February 2023 through January 2024, the running average global average air temperature exceeded 1.5 °C for the first time. This single-year breach does not violate the 1.5 °C long-term average agreed on in the 2015 Paris Agreement.
- 13 February: a study published in Current Issues in Tourism concluded that U.S. average ski seasons (incl. snowmaking) decreased from 1960–1979 to 2000–2019 by between 5.5 and 7.1 days per season, with direct economic losses estimated at $252 million annually.
- 18 March (reported): the University of Maine's Climate Reanalyzer analyzed NOAA data and concluded that the average global ocean surface temperature reached a record daily high in mid-March 2023, and remained at unprecedented high levels every day since.
- 21 March: a study published in Communications Earth & Environment concluded that higher temperatures increase inflation persistently over twelve months in both higher- and lower-income countries, with inflation pressures largest at low latitudes and having strong seasonality at high latitudes.
- 8 May (reported): Ember reported that for the first time, renewable energy generated a 30% of global electricity in 2023.
- 28 May: a study published by Climate Central, the Red Cross Red Crescent Climate Centre and World Weather Attribution concluded that over the preceding twelve months, human-caused climate change caused a worldwide average of 26 additional days of extreme heat.
- 11 June: a study published in Earth System Science Data estimated that total annual anthropogenic nitrous oxide (N_{2}O) emissions increased 40% from 1980 to 2020, exceeding projected levels under all scenarios in the CMIP6 model.

Climate Central applied a hurricane attribution framework from an Environmental Research: Climate paper to conclude that climate change's increase of water temperatures intensified peak wind speeds in all eleven 2024 Atlantic hurricanes.

Scientists in the field of extreme event attribution have concluded that in virtually all countries and territories around the world in a year-long period beginning in May 2024, human-caused global warming has increased the number of days of extreme heat events over long-term norms.

From 2023 to 2024, atmospheric carbon dioxide concentration increased by 3.5 ppm, the largest one-year increase since modern measurements began in 1957.

- 1 July (reported): Hurricane Beryl, the earliest Category 5 storm on record in the Atlantic, broke records for rapid intensification (65 mph in 24 hours), overall strength, and location for June.
- 9 July (reported): for the first time, in each month in a 12-month period (through June 2024), Earth's average temperature exceeded 1.5 °C above the pre-industrial baseline.
- 21 July: the highest daily global average temperature is recorded at 17.09 °C (62.76 °F), surpassing the previous record of 17.08 °C (62.74 °F) on 6 July 2023.
- 28 August: a study published in the journal Nature concluded that the June–September 2023 Canadian wildfires caused carbon emissions that exceeded annual fossil fuel emissions of all nations except India, China and the US.
- 20 November: a study published in Environmental Research: Climate, applied to 2024 Atlantic hurricanes to date, estimated that climate change's increase of water temperatures intensified peak wind speeds in all eleven such hurricanes by 9–28 mph (14–45 km/h), including Helene (16 mph (26 km/h)) and Milton (24 mph (39 km/h)).
- 30 November: a report from the Potsdam Institute for Climate Impact Research, Stepping back from the precipice: Transforming land management to stay within planetary boundaries, estimated an annual land degradation rate of 1,000,000 square kilometres (390,000 mi^{2}), in addition to previous accumulated land degradation of 15,000,000 square kilometres (5,800,000 mi^{2}).
- July 2025: the International Renewable Energy Agency's Renewable Power Generation Costs 2024 said that on a levelized cost of electricity (LCOE) basis, 91% of new renewable utility-scale capacity delivered power at a lower cost than the cheapest new fossil fuel-based alternative. New onshore wind projects had an LCOE of $0.034/kWh, solar photovoltaic $0.043/kWh, and hydropower $0.057/kWh.
- 16 October 2025: the World Meteorological Organization's Greenhouse Gas Bulletin reported that from 2023 to 2024, atmospheric carbon dioxide increased by 3.5 ppm, constituting the largest single-year increase since measurements began in 1957.

== Natural events and phenomena ==
- January: a study published in Annual Review of Marine Science reported that sea level rise's (SLR's) elevation of coastal water tables and shifting of their salinity landward—whose damage is "largely concealed and imperceptible"—makes potentially 1,546 coastal communities vulnerable to impacts decades before SLR-induced surface inundation.
- 12 February: a study published by the nonprofit First Street Foundation reported that improvements in air quality brought about by environmental regulation are being partially reversed by a "climate penalty" caused by climate change, especially with increases in PM2.5 particulates caused by increased wildfires.
- 28 February: a study published in Weather and Climate Dynamics statistically linked recent Arctic ice loss with warmer and drier weather in Europe, enabling "an enhanced predictability of European summer weather at least a winter in advance".
- 25 March: a study published in Oecologia concluded that global warming, and increased intensity and frequency of precipitation and wildfires, have reduced pollen diversity, negatively affecting pollen richness in the Great Basin and Sierra Nevada.
- 26 March: a study published in Nature concluded that under some circumstances, change in albedo (Earth's surface's reflection of sunlight back into space) resulting from planting more trees can cause a significant "albedo offset" that reduces the benefits of the trees' removal of carbon from the atmosphere.
- 27 March: a study published in Nature concluded that accelerated melting of ice in Greenland and Antarctica has decreased Earth's rotational velocity, affecting Coordinated Universal Time (UTC) adjustments and causing problems for computer networks that rely on UTC.

A study published in June 2024 concluded that the frequency and intensity of extreme fire events more than doubled from 2003 to 2023.

- 8 April: recognizing that climate warming causes many meteorites to be lost from the surface by melting into the Antarctic ice sheet, a study in Nature Climate Change concluded that about 5,000 meteorites become inaccessible each year. About 24% are projected to be lost by 2050, potentially rising to ~76% by 2100 under a high-emissions scenario. (Over 60% of meteorite finds on Earth originate from Antarctica.)
- 11 April: a study published in Science noted that the effect of soil inorganic carbon (SIC) on future atmospheric carbon concentrations has been inadequately studied, and projected that soil acidification associated with nitrogen additions to terrestrial ecosystems will cause release into the atmosphere up to 23 billion tonnes of carbon over the next 30 years.
- 11 May (reported): Venezuela became the first country in modern times to lose all of its glaciers, with the Humboldt Glacier having shrunk to the point that climate scientists reclassified it as an ice field.
- 20 May: a study published in the Proceedings of the National Academy of Sciences concluded that rushing of seawater beneath grounded ice over considerable distances makes Thwaites Glacier, Antarctica, more vulnerable to melting than previously anticipated, which in turn increases projections of ice mass loss.
- 6 June: a study published in Geophysical Research Letters concluded that, from 1980 through 2022, internal climate variability has enhanced Arctic warming but suppressed global warming, specifically involving warming in the Barents Sea and Kara Sea but cooling in the tropical Eastern Pacific Ocean and Southern Ocean.
Aridification

For the first time, scientists... have clearly documented current and future drying trends and impacts that reveal a global, existential peril previously shrouded by a fog of scientific uncertainty. (Aridity) and its effects threaten the lives and livelihoods of billions across almost every region of the globe.

— United Nations Convention to Combat Desertification
9 December 2024
- 13 June: the National Oceanic and Atmospheric Administration published a notice that El Niño conditions had given way to ENSO-neutral conditions in the preceding month, ending a year-long period during which ocean and air temperatures reached into record-setting territory.
- 24 June: a study published in Nature Ecology & Evolution reported that the frequency of extreme wildfires increased by a factor of 2.2 from 2003 to 2023, with the most recent 7 years including the 6 most extreme.
- 15 July: noting that global warming-induced melting of glaciers and polar ice sheets has moved mass from polar regions toward the equator to significantly change Earth's shape and increase the length of days (LOD), a study published in Proceedings of the National Academy of Sciences concluded that mass variations at the Earth's surface lengthened days between 0.3–1.0 ms/year in the 20th century, and accelerated to about 1.33 ms/year in the 21st century. Under a high emissions scenario, LOD could increase to 2.62±0.79 ms/year by 2100. LOD variations make precise timekeeping and space navigation more difficult.
- 15 July: a study published in Nature Ecology & Evolution proposed deoxygenation of freshwater and marine ecosystems as a tenth planetary boundary (with related tipping point).
- 25 July: from measurements of CO_{2} and methane emissions from exposed sediments of Great Salt Lake, a study published in One Earth concluded that such emissions are high enough that they should be accounted for in regional carbon budgets, and warrant efforts to halt and reverse the loss of saline lakes around the world.
- 9 December: a report from the UNCCD concluded that more than three-quarters of the Earth's land "has become permanently dryer in recent decades", that "drier climates now affecting vast regions across the globe will not return to how they were", and that a quarter of the global population lives in expanding drylands.
- December (reported): NOAA's 2024 Arctic Report Card stated that the Arctic tundra region had shifted from being a CO_{2} sink to being a CO_{2} source. The region continued to be a methane source.
- 5 December: a study published in Science attributed 2023's unexpectedly large rise in global average temperature to a "record low planetary albedo" resulting from a continuation of a multi-year trend of diminishing low cloud cover in the northern mid-latitudes and tropics.
- 20 December: a study published in Science of the Total Environment enumerated motivations for studying the effect of climate change on zoonotic (animal-to-human) disease transmission.
- 18 September 2025: the World Meteorological Organization's State of Global Water Resources Report 2024 concluded that only one third of river basins had normal hydrological conditions in 2024, and that all glacier regions lost ice for third straight year.

== Actions and goal statements ==
=== Science and technology ===
- 2 January: the first commercial-scale offshore wind farm in the U.S. began operation 15 miles (24 km) off the coast of Martha's Vineyard, Massachusetts, initially providing 5 MW from one wind turbine, but planning an eventual 62 turbines capable of powering 400,000 homes and businesses.
- 11 January: a study in Nature Cities presents results of a Riyadh-based trial of eight urban heat mitigation scenarios, finding large cooling effects with combinations that include reflective rooftop materials, irrigated greenery, and retrofitting.
- 18 January: the first successful test of a solar farm in space—collecting solar power from a photovoltaic cell and beaming energy down to Earth—constituted an early feasibility demonstration.
- February: an underwater generator operating on the principle of a kite travels a figure-8 pattern, moving faster than the current that drives it. A 1.2 MW utility-scale generator began providing power to the grid of the Faroe Islands.
- 9 February: researchers use simulations to develop an early-warning signal for a potential collapse of the AMOC published in Science Advances and suggest it indicates the AMOC is "on route to tipping".
- 5 March: in a non-unanimous vote, the IUGS's Subcommission on Quaternary Stratigraphy voted against declaring the Anthropocene a new geological epoch. The vote leaves open more informally classifying human impacts as a geological event that unfolds gradually over a long period.
- March: the largest inventory of methane emissions from U.S. oil and gas production, published in Nature, finds them to be largely concentrated and around three times the national government inventory estimate. Methane emissions from U.S. landfills are quantified in Science, with super-emitting point-sources accounting for almost 90% thereof.
- March (reported inventions): a wind-powered electrodynamic screen (EDS) generates strong electric fields that repel dust and contaminants from the surface of solar panels, thereby increasing the panels' efficiency while avoiding manual cleaning. Researchers demonstrate simultaneous radiative cooling and solar power generation from the same area.
- April (reported): a new glass-ceramic material placed atop solar panels transforms ultraviolet light into visible light, effectively increasing the amount of usable light from the sun (the material passes visible light, as normal).
- April (reported): "rock flour"—rock that has been finely ground by glaciers and having large surface area per unit volume—has been found to enhance "chemical weathering" that removes carbon from air when spread across ground surfaces. A similar sequestration process, using concrete particles 1 millimeter in diameter, has also been tested.
- 2 April: the first outdoor test in the U.S. of marine cloud brightening technology—designed to brighten clouds and reflect sunlight back into space—tested whether a machine could consistently spray the right size salt aerosols through the open air outside of a lab. Local authorities halted the project the following month, citing concerns for public health and safety.
- 3 April: a study published in Communications Earth & Environment reasoned that reductions of planet-cooling aerosol emissions due to air quality legislation will worsen Earth's energy imbalance in addition to that caused by greenhouse gas emissions, concluding that accelerated global warming in this decade is to be expected.
- 30 May: a study published in Communications Earth & Environment concluded that a 2020 International Maritime Organization fuel regulation to reduce sulfur emissions from international shipping reduced aerosol pollution along shipping lanes, but caused an increase in radiative forcing (global warming effect) that the researchers called an "inadvertent geoengineering termination shock with global impact".
- 5 June: a study published in Nature introduced a "charge-sorbent" material having reactive hydroxide ions embedded in the pores of an activated carbon material, the ions removing CO_{2} from the air through bicarbonate formation. After being saturated with CO_{2}, the charge-sorbent material's properties can be renewed at low temperatures 90 to 100 °C (194 to 212 °F).
- June (reported): a consortium of maritime experts proposed a fuel use reduction system in which ships coordinate non-conflicting arrival times at ports, to avoid the conventional "sail fast, then wait" practice by cruising at generally slower, fuel-saving speeds.
- July (reported): warming climate is found to create glacial meltwater that washes away temporally ordered layers of trapped aerosols that researchers use as an historical record of environmental events. The Ice Memory Foundation plans to store additional ice cores in Antarctica in advance of this impending loss of data.
- October: A paper published in arXiv proposing twelve policy recommendations surrounding Energy and Environmental Reporting Obligations; Legal and Regulatory Clarifications; Transparency and Accountability Mechanisms; and Future Far-Reaching Measures beyond Transparency to combat the effects of Artificial Intelligence and data centers on climate change with reference to the shortcomings of the EU AI Act.
- November (reported): U.S. government agencies are operating an airborne early warning system for detecting small concentrations of aerosols to detect where other countries might be carrying out geoengineering attempts. Solar radiation modification is thought to have unpredictable effects on climate.

=== Political, economic, legal, and cultural actions ===
As a source of electric power in the EU, renewables overtook fossil fuels by 2020, and solar and wind together exceeded fossil fuels by 2025.

The share of electricity coming from renewable sources continues to vary widely among European nations. A few countries generate more electricity from renewables than is consumed in total.

- 8 February: climate scientist Michael E. Mann won a $1 million judgment for punitive damages in a defamation lawsuit filed in 2012 against bloggers who attacked his hockey stick graph of global temperature rise, one of the bloggers having called Mann's work "fraudulent".

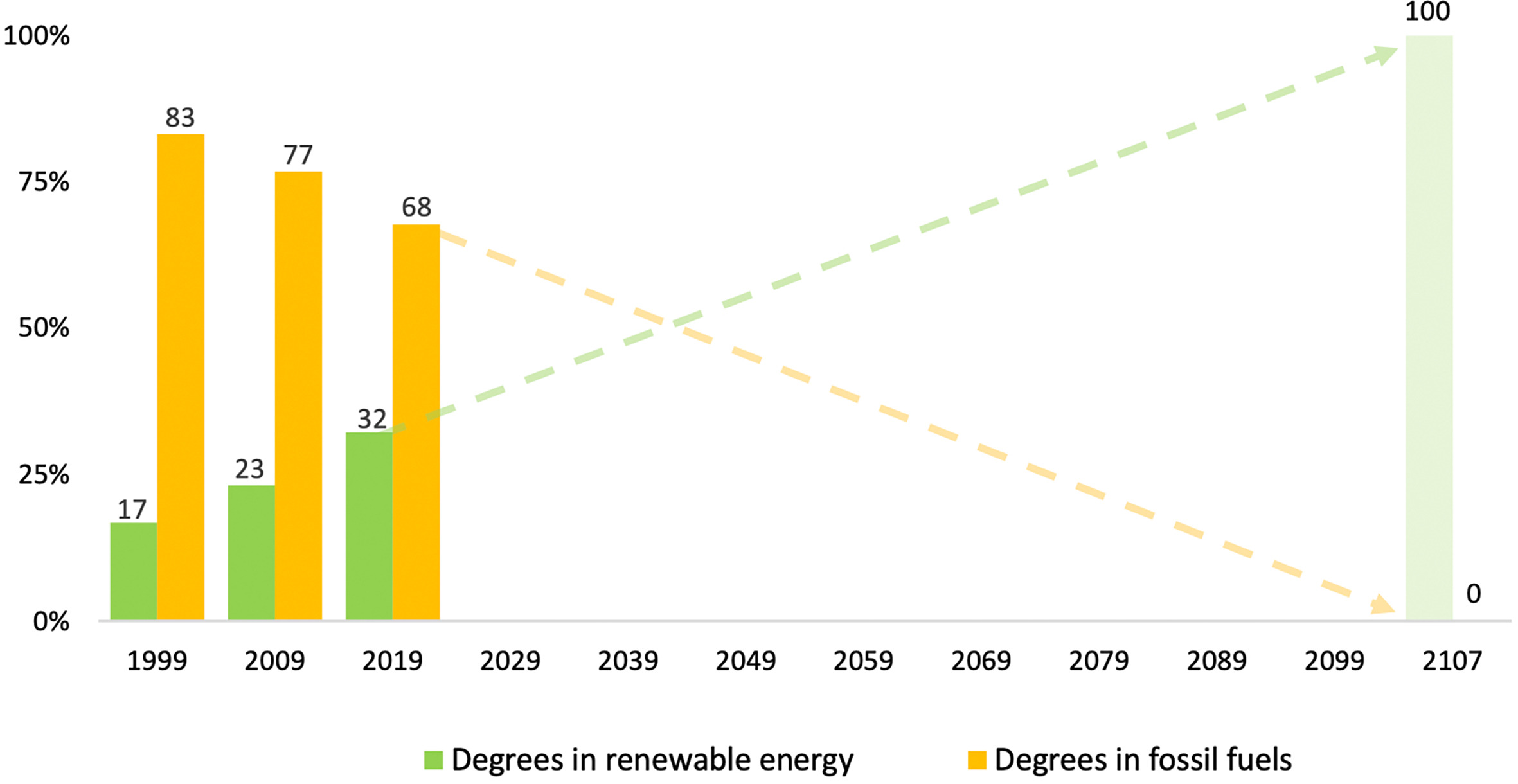
Educational content of 18,400 universities worldwide higher education was found to not be transitioning from fossil fuels to renewable energy curricula nearly fast enough to meet future workforce demands.

- 14 February: a study in Energy Research & Social Science reviewed educational content of 18,400 universities worldwide, finding higher education is not transitioning from fossil fuels to renewable energy curricula, failing to meet the growing demand for a clean energy workforce.
- March (reported): website Realtor.com added property-specific tools describing individual properties' vulnerability to heat, wind, and air quality, publishing current risks and projected risks 30 years into the future.
Denial, Disinformation, and Doublespeak

● Documents demonstrate for the first time that fossil fuel companies internally do not dispute that they have understood since at least the 1960s that burning fossil fuels causes climate change and then worked for decades to undermine public understanding of this fact and to deny the underlying science.
● Big Oil's deception campaign evolved from explicit denial of the basic science underlying climate change to deception, disinformation, and doublespeak.

— House Committee on Oversight and Accountability,
and U.S. Senate Committee on the Budget
30 April 2024
Highway to climate hell

In the case of climate, we are not the dinosaurs. We are the meteor. We are not only in danger, we are the danger. But, we are also the solution.

— UN Secretary-General António Guterres
5 June 2024
- 22 March: the Nauta provincial court (Peru) ruled that the Marañón River has "intrinsic" value and possesses the rights to exist, flow, and be free from pollution. The ruling was the first time Peru has legally recognized "rights of nature".
- 29 March: the Inter-American Court of Human Rights, based in Costa Rica, ruled that the government of Peru is liable for physical and mental harm to people caused by a metallurgical facility's pollution, and ordered the government to provide free medical care and monetary compensation to victims.
- 9 April: in its first ruling on climate litigation, the European Court of Human Rights ruled that Switzerland's failure to adequately tackle the climate crisis breached 2000 women plaintiffs' human rights to effective protection from "the serious adverse effects of climate change on lives, health, well-being and quality of life".
- 30 April: G7 ministers agreed to end unabated coal power plants by 2035, giving leeway for countries whose power plants are fitted with carbon capture technology.
- 1 May: a three-judge panel of the 9th U.S. Circuit Court of Appeals ruled that Juliana v. United States should be dismissed. The lawsuit was filed in 2015 by 21 young people claiming the U.S. government's energy policies violate their rights to be protected from climate change, more specifically, violating their rights to due process and equal protection under the U.S. Constitution.
- 21 May: in an advisory opinion that could provide precedent for other cases, the International Tribunal for the Law of the Sea ruled that greenhouse gas emissions absorbed by the oceans constitute marine pollution, and that countries have a legal obligation to monitor and reduce such emissions. The tribunal laid out specific requirements for environmental impact assessments.
- 29 May: a study published in Cell Reports Sustainability estimated 2022 climate and health benefits of using wind and solar rather than fossil fuels to be $143/MWh (wind) and $100/MWh (solar). The study estimated $249 billion of climate and air quality benefits in the U.S. from 2019-2022.
- 30 May: Vermont became the first U.S. state to enact a law, the Climate Superfund Act, requiring the state to charge fossil fuel companies for climate impacts of their fossil fuel emissions.
- 2 June: Mexico elected as president, a climate scientist with a doctorate in energy engineering who had helped to write Intergovernmental Panel on Climate Change (IPCC) reports.
- 5 June: UN Secretary-General António Guterres called on all countries to ban advertising from fossil fuel companies, calling them "the Godfathers of climate chaos".
- 20 June: the governor of the U.S. state of Hawaii announced a court-approved settlement in the constitutional climate case, Navahine v. Hawaiʻi Department of Transportation. In the settlement, the state acknowledges the constitutional right of Hawaii's youth to a "life-sustaining climate", and commits the state to implement "transformative changes of Hawaii's transportation system to achieve the state's goal of net-negative emissions by 2045".
- 29 August: the Constitutional Court of Korea ruled that the absence of legally binding targets for greenhouse gas reductions for 2031-2049 violated the constitutional rights of future generations, saying that this lack of long-term targets shifted an excessive burden to the future.
- 30 September: Britain's coal-powered Ratcliffe-on-Soar Power Station closed, ending the U.K.'s 142-year use of coal to generate electricity.
- 15 October (reported): the University of California, San Diego implemented a graduation requirement to take courses that cover at least 30% climate-related content and address two of four areas: scientific foundations, human impacts, mitigation strategies and project-based learning.
- 11–22 November: negotiators at the COP29 conference in Baku, Azerbaijan eventually came to an agreement in which wealthy nations pledged to provide $300 billion per year in support by 2035, up from a previous target of $100 billion but less than the $1.3 trillion per year that independent experts said is needed to keep global warming under 1.5 °C.
- 11–22 November: after years of deadlock, governments attending the COP29 conference agreed to rules on creating, trading and registering emission reductions and removals as carbon credits that higher-emission countries can buy, thus providing funding for low-emission technologies.
- 2 December: The International Court of Justice in The Hague, Netherlands began hearings to form advisory opinions on how countries should control greenhouse gas emissions, and the consequences if they do not. The ICJ's advisory opinions are non-binding but are considered legally and politically significant.
- 18 December: the Montana Supreme Court affirmed the August 14, 2023 trial court decision in Held v. Montana, which held that the state's limiting consideration of environmental factors when deciding oil and gas permits, violated the youth plaintiffs' right to a safe environment recited in Montana's constitution.

=== Mitigation goal statements ===
- January (reported in TIME): The IEA has outlined that by 2030, we must triple our reliance on renewable sources of energy, double energy efficiency, significantly cut methane emissions, and increase electrification with existing technologies.

=== Adaptation goal statements ===
- 4 February (reported): to reduce sea level rise caused by melting of Antarctica's Thwaites and Pine Island glaciers, scientists proposed a "Seabed Curtain" 100 kilometres (62 mi) long, moored to and rising from the bed of the Amundsen Sea, designed to reduce the amount of warm ocean water that would melt the base of those glaciers.

== Consensus ==
In a UNDP survey covering 77 countries, most respondents from top fossil fuel-producing countries favored a quick transition away from fossil fuels.

- 9 February: a global survey of almost 130,000 individuals whose results were published in Nature Climate Change found that 69% of respondents were willing to contribute 1% of their income to support action against climate change, 86% endorsed pro-climate social norms, and 89% demanded greater political action. However, the world was said to be in a state of pluralistic ignorance, in which people underestimate the willingness of others to act.
- 18 July: an analysis found that 100 U.S. Representatives and 23 U.S. Senators—23% of the 535 members of the U.S. Congress—were climate change deniers. All were Republicans.
- 7 August: a study published in PLOS One found that even a single repetition of a claim was sufficient to increase the perceived truth of both climate science-aligned claims and climate change skeptic/denial claims—"highlighting the insidious effect of repetition". This effect was found even among climate science endorsers.
- 12 August (published): 2023 U.S. survey found no evidence that climate crisis or climate emergency—terms less familiar to those surveyed—elicit more perceived urgency than climate change or global warming.
- 15 October (reported): a global survey of 3,000 risk experts and 20,000 members of the public by insurance company Axa found that Europeans ranked climate change as a pressing emerging risk the highest out of any group, with 67% of experts and 49% of the public putting it in their top five risks. The corresponding US numbers were 43% and 38% respectively, although climate was the single most concerning future risk.

== Projections ==
In a 2024 survey, 76.3% of responding IPCC lead authors and review editors projected at least 2.5 °C of global warming by 2100; only 5.79% forecast warming of 1.5 °C or less.

Though Europe and North America have the most potential venues for Olympic Winter Games, a study published in 2024 projected that a higher portion of those venues will be climatically unreliable because of global warming.

- January: the World Economic Forum projected that, by 2050, directly and indirectly, climate change will cause 14.5 million deaths and $12.5 trillion in economic losses.
- 13 February: a study published in Current Issues in Tourism projected that for the 2050s, U.S. ski seasons will shorten between 14–33 days (low emissions scenario) and 27 to 62 days (high emissions scenario), with direct economic losses of $657 million to 1.352 billion annually.
- 5 March: a study published in Nature Reviews Earth & Environment projected that the first single occurrence (September; not year-round) of an ice-free Arctic "could occur in 2020–2030s under all emission trajectories and are likely to occur by 2050". Daily ice-free conditions are expected approximately 4 years earlier on average.
- 6 March: a study in Nature finds U.S. land area of ~1,200 km^{2} (460 mi^{2}) is threatened by coastal subsidence by 2050 due to sea level rise.
- 13 March: a study published in PLOS One projected that 13% of all current ski areas are projected to completely lose natural annual snow cover by 2100.
- 17 April: a study published in Nature forecast that by 2050, climate change will cause average incomes to fall by almost 20% and will cause $38 trillion of destruction each year. In December 2025, the Nature article was retracted due to errors in Uzbekistan economic data, and these two figures, among others, were corrected downward to 17% and $32 trillion, respectively.
- 8 May (reported): in a poll by The Guardian of contactable lead authors or review editors of IPCC reports since 2018, 76.3% of respondents projected at least 2.5 °C of global warming; only 5.79% forecast warming of 1.5 °C or less.
- March: a study published in The Lancet Planetary Health projected both "substantial losses" of habitat for venomous snakes by 2070, and migration of venomous species across international borders presenting new dangers to public health.
- 14 May: a study published in Nature Communications forecast that by 2050, 177–246 million older adults will be exposed to dangerous acute heat, the most severe effects forecast in Asia and Africa which also have the lowest adaptive capacity.
- 24 September: a study published in Nature Communications concluded that rapid permafrost thaw will lead to soil drying, surface warming, and reduction of relative humidity over the Arctic-Subarctic region, which will cause rapid intensification of wildfires in western Siberia and Canada.
- 4 October: the World Health Organization (WHO) projected that without "urgent action", climate change will cause 5 million people to die from undernutrition, malaria, diarrhea and heat stress from 2030 to 2050.
- 14 October: a study in the Proceedings of the National Academy of Sciences projected that with continued grid decarbonization, electrification of vehicles in the U.S. would reduce harmful air quality–related health impacts by $84 to $188 billion from 2022 through 2050.
- 11 December: applying a fusion of probabilistic projections, a study published in the American Geophysical Union's Earth's Future journal projected "very likely" (5th–95th %ile) sea level rise by the year 2100 to be 0.3–1.0 m (12–39 in) under a low-emissions scenario and 0.5–1.9 m (20–75 in) under a high-emissions scenario.

== Significant publications ==
- "State of the World's Migratory Species" (PDF). UN Environment Programme World Conservation Monitoring Centre (UNEP-WCMC). February 2024. Archived (PDF) from the original on 12 February 2024.
- "State of the Global Climate 2023". WMO.int. World Meteorological Organization. 19 March 2024. Archived from the original on 19 March 2024. WMO-No. 1347.
- "Europe is not prepared for rapidly growing climate risks". European Environment Agency. 10 March 2024.
- Ripple, William J.; Wolf, Christopher; Gregg, Jillian W.; Rockstrom, Johan; Mann, Michael E.; Oreskes, Naomi; et al. (8 October 2024). "The 2024 state of the climate report: Perilous times on planet Earth". BioScience. biae087 (12): 812–824. doi:10.1093/biosci/biae087.
- "Surging Seas in a Warming World: The latest science on present-day impacts and future projections of sea-level rise" (PDF). United Nations. 26 August 2024.
- Olhoff, Anne; Bataille, Chris; Christensen, John; Den Elzen, Michel; Fransen, Taryn; Grant, Neil; Blok, Kornelis; Kejun, Jiang; Soubeyran, Eleonore; Lamb, William; Levin, Kelly; Portugal-Pereira, Joana; Pathak, Minal; Kuramochi, Takeshi; Strinati, Costanza; Roe, Stephanie; Rogelj, Joeri (24 October 2024). Emissions Gap Report 2024 (PDF). United Nations Environment Programme. doi:10.59117/20.500.11822/46404. ISBN 978-92-807-4185-8.
- "2024 Living Planet Report - A System in Peril" (PDF). World Wildlife Fund. 27 October 2024.
- "Adaptation Gap Report 2024". United Nations Environment Programme. 7 November 2024.
- "State of the Cryosphere 2024 / Lost Ice, Global Damage" (PDF). International Cryosphere Climate Initiative. 14 November 2024.
- "The Future of Geothermal Energy" (PDF). International Energy Agency (IEA). December 2024. Archived (PDF) from the original on 14 December 2024.
- Van Dijk, A.I.J.M., H.E. Beck, E. Boergens, R.A.M. de Jeu, W.A. Dorigo, C. Edirisinghe, E. Forootan, E. Guo, A. Güntner, J. Hou, N. Mehrnegar, S. Mo, W. Preimesberger, J. Rahman, P. Rozas Larraondo. "Global Water Monitor 2024, Summary Report". www.globalwater.online. Global Water Monitor Consortium. 2 January 2025. Archived from the original on 6 January 2025.
- Blunden, J.; Reagan, J.; Dunn, R. J. H. (August 2025). "State of the Climate in 2024" (PDF). Bulletin of the American Meteorological Society. 106 (8): S1–S513. Bibcode:2025BAMS..106Q...1B. doi:10.1175/2025BAMSStateoftheClimate.1.

== See also ==
- Meteorology in the 21st century
- Climatology § History
- History of climate change policy and politics
- History of climate change science
- Politics of climate change § History
- Timeline of sustainable energy research 2020–present
