= Elnur Soltanov =

Deputy Minister of Energy of Azerbaijan

Elnur Soltanov is the deputy energy minister of Azerbaijan. He is the chief executive of Cop29.
