= Mukhtar Babayev =

Azerbaijani politician (born 1967)

- Muxtar Babayev
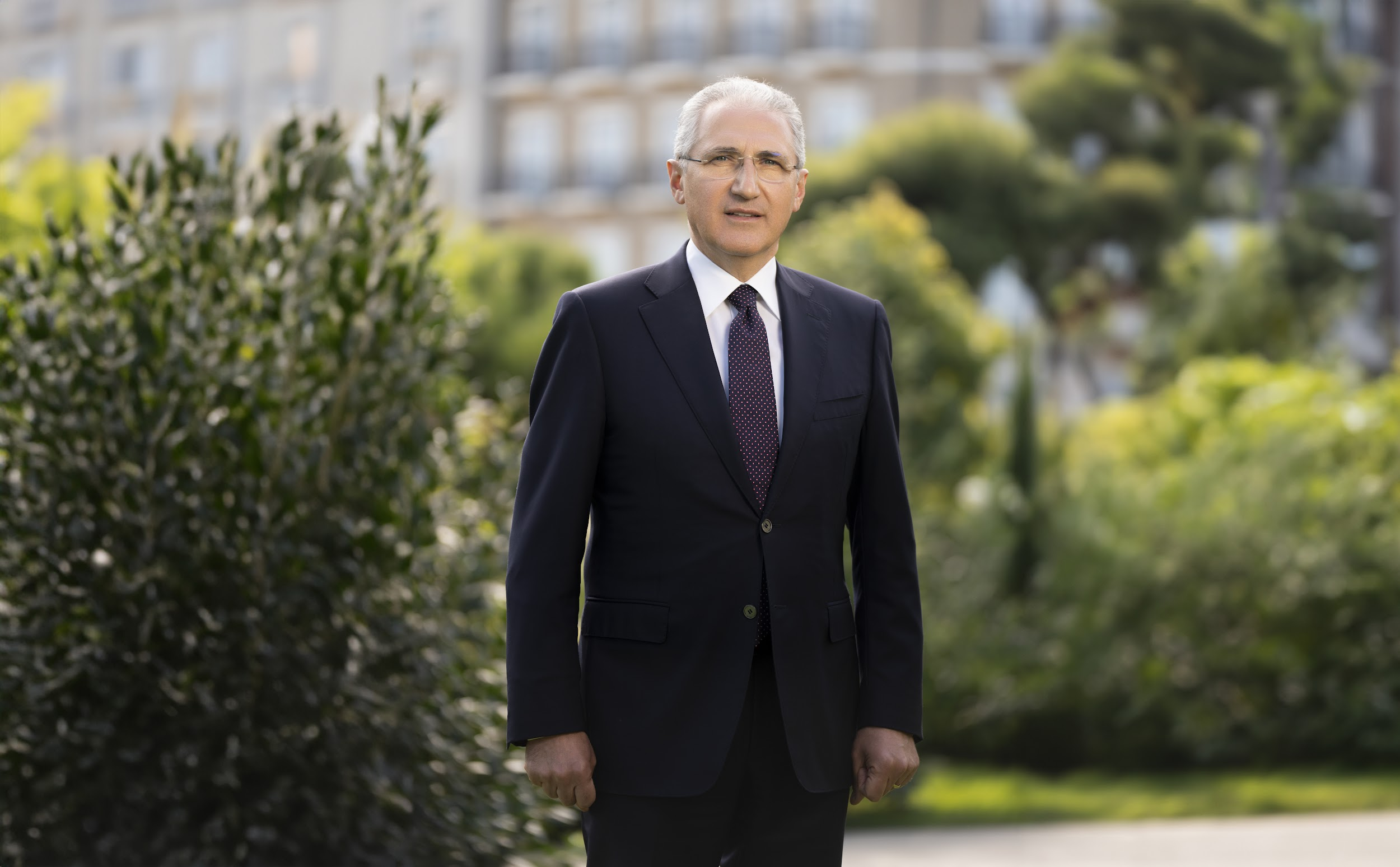
- Babayev in 2018

Minister of Ecology and Natural Resources
- Incumbent
- Assumed office 23 April 2018
- President: Ilham Aliyev
- Preceded by: Huseyngulu Baghirov

Member of the National Assembly for Sumgait's 3rd constituency
- In office 30 November 2010 – 23 April 2018
- Preceded by: Nizami Iskandarov
- Succeeded by: Emin Hajiyev

Personal details
- Born: 16 October 1967 (age 58) Baku, Azerbaijani SSR, Soviet Union
- Party: New Azerbaijan Party
- Education: Moscow State University (1991); Azerbaijan State University of Economics (1994); All-Russian Academy of Foreign Trade (2000)
- Awards

Mukhtar Bahadur oghlu Babayev (Azerbaijani: Muxtar Bahadur oğlu Babayev; born 16 October 1967) is an Azerbaijani politician, who was the Representative of the President of the Republic of Azerbaijan for Climate Issues (since 2025), Minister of Ecology and Natural Resources of the Republic of Azerbaijan (2018–2025), a deputy of the IV and V convocations of the National Assembly of the Republic of Azerbaijan, President of the Azerbaijan Mountaineering Federation, and President of COP29.

The Azerbaijan government appointed Babayev as president of COP29, the 2024 United Nations Climate Change Conference.

== Biography ==
Mukhtar Babayev was born on October 16, 1967, in Baku. He graduated from secondary school in Baku in 1984.

He served in the military from 1986 to 1988. In 1991, he graduated from the Faculty of Philosophy of Moscow State University with a degree in Political Science. In 1994, he graduated from the Azerbaijan State University of Economics with a degree in Foreign Economic Relations.

In 2000, he completed a degree in World Economy at the All-Russian Academy of Foreign Trade. From 1991 to 1992, he worked at the State Committee for Economy and Planning of the Republic of Azerbaijan.

== Political career ==
From 1992 to 1993, he worked at the Ministry of Foreign Economic Relations of the Republic of Azerbaijan. From 1994 to 2003, he worked in the Department of Foreign Economic Relations of SOCAR, the Azerbaijan state-owned petroleum company and from 2003 to 2007, he worked in the Department of Marketing and Economic Operations of SOCAR. From 2007 to 2010, he served as Vice President for Ecology at SOCAR. From 2010 to 2018, he was the Chairman of the Supervisory Board of SOCAR’s “Azerikimya” Production Union.

He was elected as a deputy of the IV and V convocations of the National Assembly of the Republic of Azerbaijan in 2010 and 2015. On December 7, 2010, he became a member of the National Assembly’s Committee on Natural Resources, Energy and Ecology.

Since April 23, 2018, he served as the Minister of Ecology and Natural Resources of the Republic of Azerbaijan. He was relieved of this position by a presidential decree dated February 5, 2025. By another presidential decree, he was appointed the Representative of the President of the Republic of Azerbaijan for Climate Issues.

He was the head of the Azerbaijan-Japan interparliamentary relations working group, a member of the working groups on relations with the parliaments of Belarus, Chile, China, Afghanistan, Sweden, Lithuania, Libya, the Netherlands, Uzbekistan, Peru, and Russia.

He is a member of the ruling New Azerbaijan Party.

On January 7, 2024, by order of the President of the Republic of Azerbaijan, Ilham Aliyev, he was appointed President of the 29th session of the Conference of the Parties (COP29) to the United Nations Framework Convention on Climate Change, the 19th session of the Meeting of the Parties to the Kyoto Protocol, and the 6th session of the Meeting of the Parties to the Paris Agreement.

== Awards ==
- Taraggi Medal — 19 September 2012
- Shohrat Order — 7 November 2017
- Order of the Rising Sun, 2nd Class, Gold and Silver Star — 29 April 2022
