= Corporate Europe Observatory =

Nonprofit research and campaign group

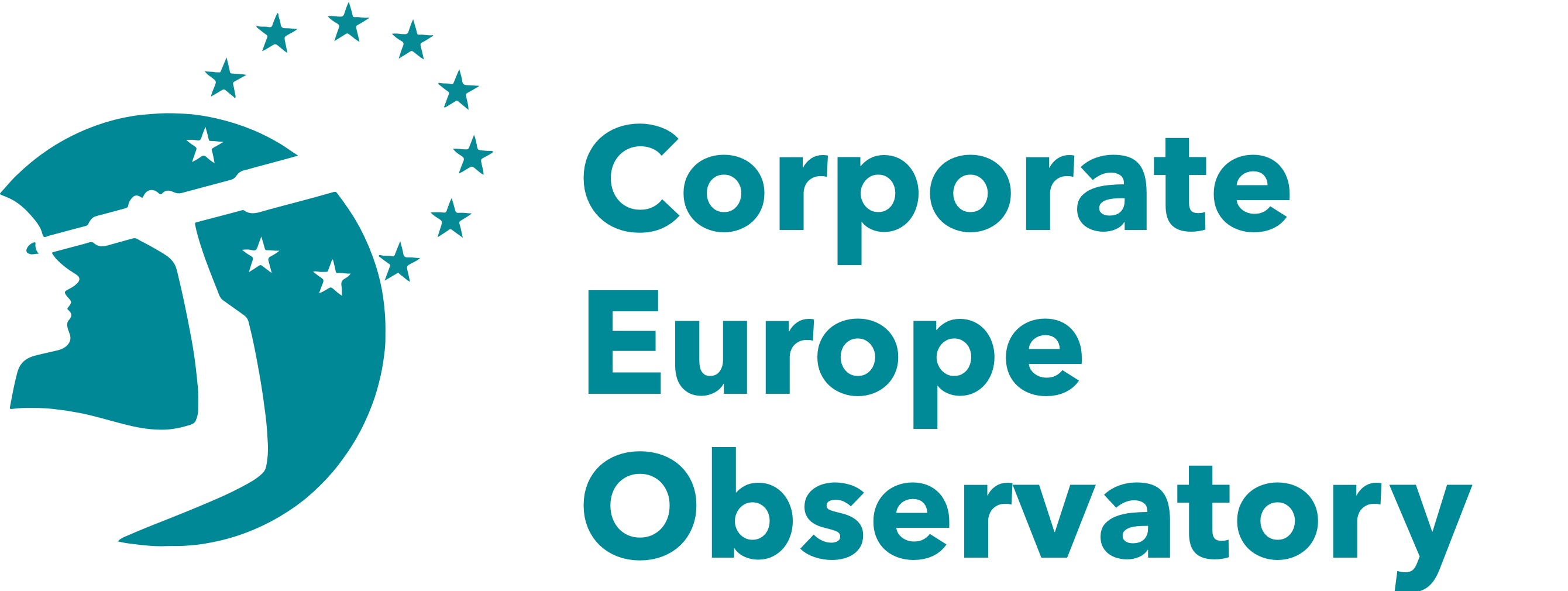
- Abbreviation: CEO
- Formation: 1997
- Type: Foundation
- Budget: 806.686 € (2019)
- Staff: 13
- Website: www.corporateeurope.org

The Corporate Europe Observatory (CEO) is a nonprofit research and campaign group whose declared aim is to "expose any effects of corporate lobbying on EU policy making". It is based in Brussels.

The team (2021) consists of 13 staff members.

== Areas of work ==
EU decisions and policies often mirror the interests of big business, as a result of the corporate capture of EU decision-making processes. This has consequences in terms of social and economic injustice and inequality, climate change and environmental destruction. Thus, CEO has developed a particular expertise in the following EU policy areas: agriculture, food safety, energy, climate change, EU lobbying regulation, trade, investment, economy, and finance.

Corporate Europe Observatory's reports often attract the attention of media from all over the world. Recently, it gained international attention by announcing (in a joint publication with Global Witness and Corporate Accountability) that at COP26 the fossil fuel industry had the largest delegation at the summit.

With French NGO Observatoire des multinationales, CEO issued a report on Emmanuel Macron's French Presidency of the EU Council which shows how the French EU Presidency had been prepared closely with the industry, raising several democratic concerns.

CEO's work as a lobby watchdog of big pharma and big tech, has also issued significant reports, which were published in The New York Times, and Reuters.

== Working in coalitions ==
Corporate Europe Observatory carries out research and publishes reports on corporate lobbying activities at the EU level.

CEO is one of the founders of the Alliance for Lobbying Transparency and Ethics Regulation (ALTER-EU). This coalition of over 160 civil society groups, trade unions, academics and public affairs firms monitors the influence of lobbyists on the political agenda in Europe.

In 2010 ALTER-EU published "Bursting the Brussels Bubble". This collection of articles provides an insight into decision-making in the European Union and explores some lobbying techniques.

CEO jointly organises the Worst EU Lobbying Awards, which are given to the lobby group, which uses "the most deceptive, misleading or otherwise problematic lobbying tactics in their attempts to influence EU decision-making" in a given year.
