= Nigar Arpadarai =

Azerbaijani politician (born 1982)

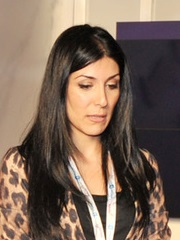

Member of the National Assembly of the Republic of Azerbaijan
- Incumbent
- Assumed office 9 February 2020
- Preceded by: Şəmsəddin Hacıyev

Personal details
- Born: 17 January 1982 (age 44) Baku, Azerbaijan SSR, USSR
- Party: Independent
- Education: Baku State University

Nigar Javid gizi Arpadarai (Azerbaijani: Nigar Cavid qızı Arpadarai, born 17 January 1982) is a member of the VI convocation of the National Assembly of the Republic of Azerbaijan and a member of the Azerbaijani delegation to the Parliamentary Assembly of the Council of Europe and the Chairman of the Working Group on Azerbaijan–Portugal inter-parliamentary relations. Previously she was the Head of the Marketing and Communications Department, as well as the National Press Secretary, of the Formula 1 Azerbaijan Grand Prix, between 2015 and 2020.

== Biography ==
Nigar Arpadarai was born on 17 January 1982 in Baku into a family of artists. She graduated from Baku Secondary School No. 44 in 1998. She studied at the Faculty of International Relations and International Law at Baku State University, majoring in International Law, in 1998–2002.

In 2002–2004, she received a Master's degree in International Law from the Faculty of International Relations and International Law at the Baku State University. She graduated with an honors diploma in 2004.

Her father, Javid Arpadarai is an artist. He was the Director of the Aziz Azimzade State Art School between 1992 and 2001. He is a member of the Artists' Union of Azerbaijan. Her mother, Latafat Mammadova is the daughter of Hafiz Mammadov, Honored Art Worker of the Azerbaijan SSR, and a member of the Artists' Union of the USSR. She worked at the Azerbaijan State Pedagogical University between 1980 and 2001. From 1996 to 2001 she worked as the Head of the Department of Art at the Azerbaijan State Pedagogical University. She is a member of the Artists' Union of Azerbaijan. Currently, she works in Istanbul, Turkey. She is a member of the International Association of Art.

Nigar Arpadarai is married and has two sons.

== Career ==
Her professional career began at the Embassy of the Hellenic Republic in Azerbaijan from 2002 to 2005. From 2006 to 2009, she worked as an Assistant Special Envoy to the European Commission Representation in Azerbaijan, and from 2008 to 2009 as a Press and Information Specialist. From 2009 to 2015, she worked at the Azerbaijani telecom company Azerfon in various positions including:

- 2009–2010: Specialist in Corporate Sales;
- 2010–2011: Brand Promotion Manager, Azerfon–Vodafone (Global Vodafone Partner);
- 2011–2012: Brand Promotion Manager, Foreign Affairs Manager, Strategic Brand Promotion Manager in the Marketing Department;
- 2012–2015: Head of Public Relations (PR) and Corporate Communications.

In 2015, she was appointed Head of Marketing and Communications and National Press Officer at Baku City Circuit Operations Company, the Promoter of the Formula 1 Azerbaijan Grand Prix. She held this position until 2020.

On 9 February 2020, she was elected as a deputy for the 6th convocation of the National Assembly of the Republic of Azerbaijan for the period 2020–2025.

=== Committees ===
In the National Assembly of the Republic of Azerbaijan:

- Committee on International Relations and Interparliamentary Relations;
- Committee on Family, Women and Children;

In the Parliamentary Assembly of the Council of Europe:

- Committee on Migration, Refugees and Internally Displaced Persons;
- Committee on Social Affairs, Health and Sustainable Development.
