= Health in Azerbaijan =

The Human Rights Measurement Initiative finds that Azerbaijan is fulfilling 67.3% of what it should be fulfilling for the right to health based on its level of income. When looking at the right to health with respect to children, Azerbaijan achieves 93.5% of what is expected based on its current income. In regards to the right to health amongst the adult population, the country achieves only 91.1% of what is expected based on the nation's level of income. Azerbaijan falls into the "very bad" category when evaluating the right to reproductive health because the nation is fulfilling only 17.2% of what the nation is expected to achieve based on the resources (income) it has available.

== Life expectancy ==
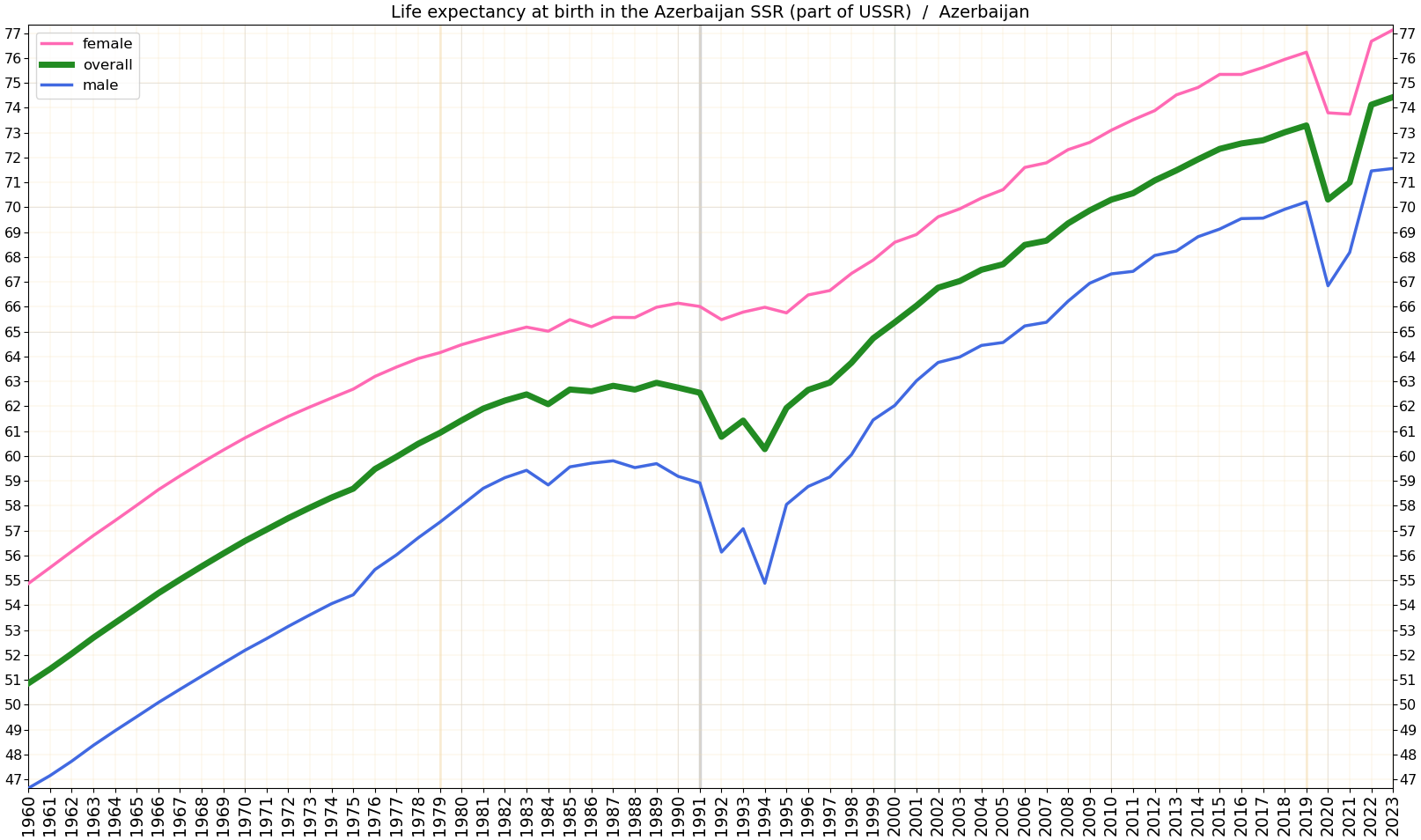
Life expectancy at birth in Azerbaijan

Average life expectancy for Azerbaijanis is 72.7 gives Azerbaijan a World Life Expectancy ranking of 96 according to WHO data. The life expectancy at birth in Azerbaijan is 69.6 for males, and 75.8 for females (2016 est).

== Fertility and mortality rates ==
The total fertility rate is 1.9 children per woman (2013).Neonatal mortality rate is 18.2 per 1000 live births (2015), and maternal mortality ratio is 25 per 100,000 live births (2015).

== See also ==
- Healthcare in Azerbaijan
