= Health in Uganda =

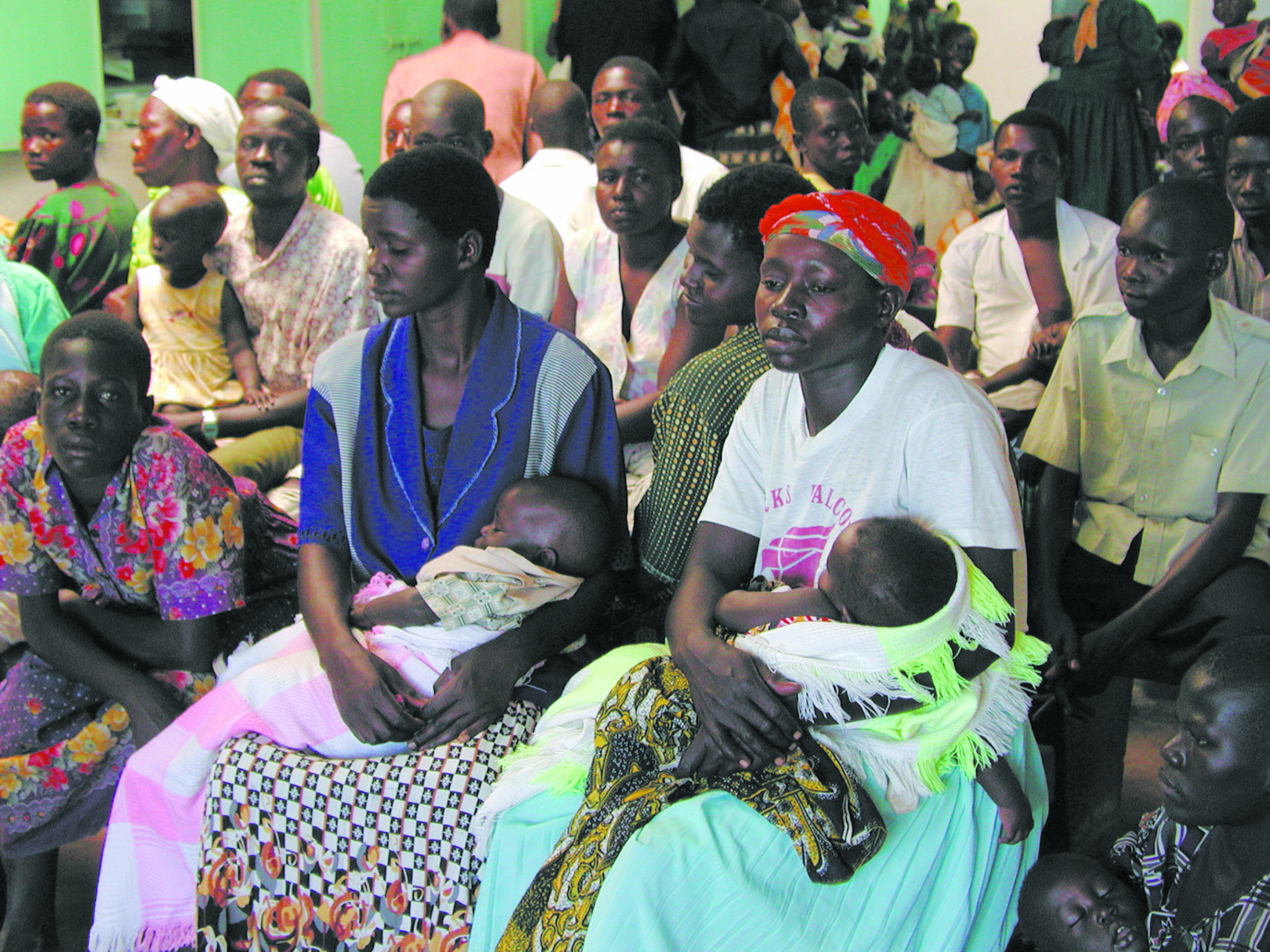
Ugandan patients at the Out-Patient Department of Apac Hospital in northern Uganda. The majority are mothers of children under five years old with malaria.

According to the recently conducted national survey in 2024, Uganda's population stands at 45.9 million. Health status is measured by some of the key indicators such as life expectancy at birth, child mortality rate, neonatal mortality rate and infant mortality rate, maternal mortality ratio, nutrition status and the global burden of disease. The life expectancy of Uganda has increased from 39.3 in 1950 to 62.7 years in 2021. This is lower below the world average which is at 71.0 years. The fertility rate of Ugandan women slightly increased from an average of 6.89 babies per woman in the 1950s to about 7.12 in the 1970s before declining to an estimated 4.3 babies in 2019. This figure is higher than the world average of 2 and most world regions including South East Asia, Middle East and North Africa, Europe and Central Asia and America. The under-5-mortality-rate for Uganda has decreased from 191 deaths per 1000 live births in 1970 to 41 deaths per 1000 live births in 2022.

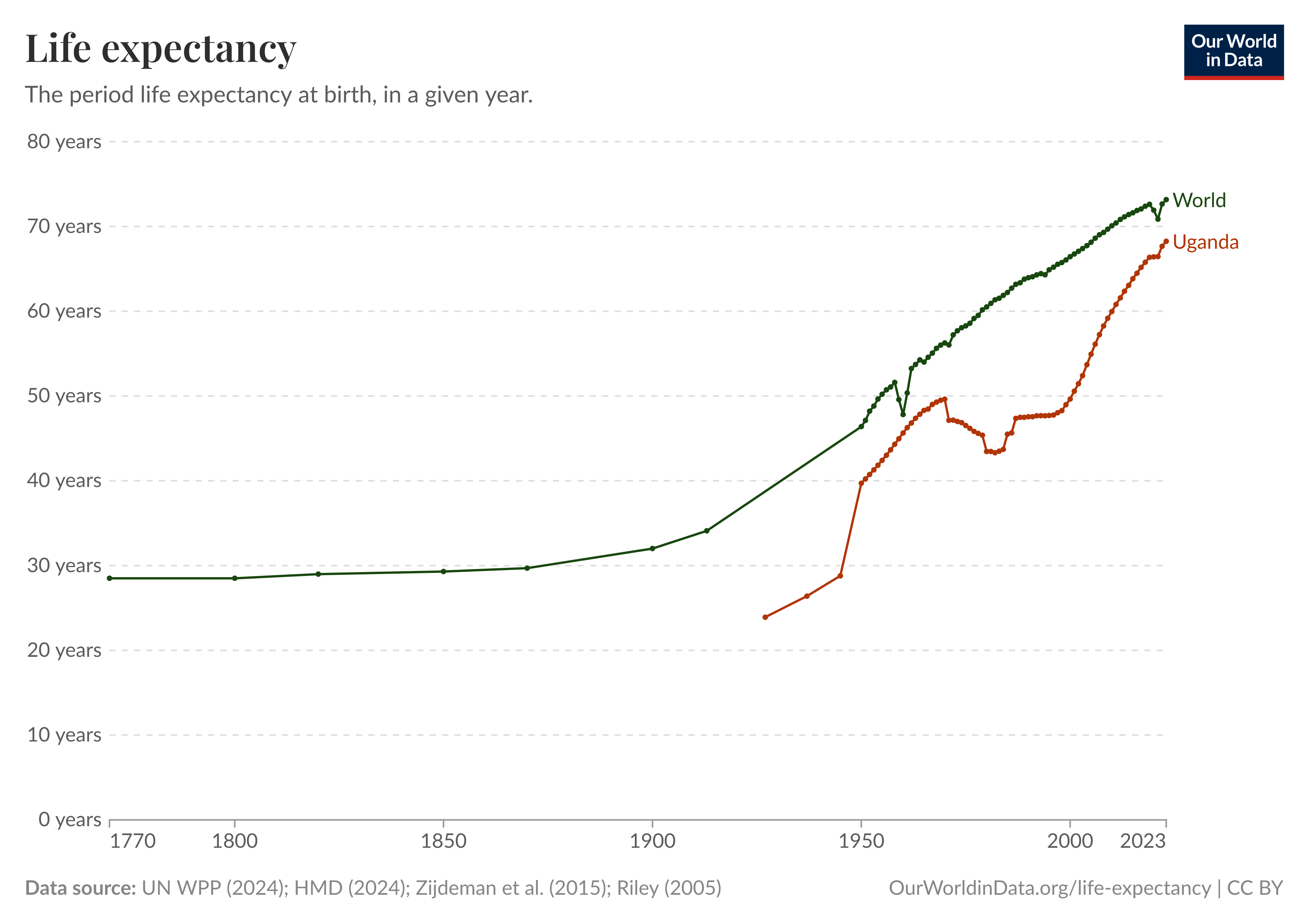
Life expectancy of Uganda as per 2021

The Human Rights Measurement Initiative found that Uganda is fulfilling 80.0% of what it should be fulfilling for the right to health based on its level of income. Total health expenditure as a percentage of gross domestic product (GDP) was 4.67% in 2021.

== Health structure in Uganda ==
Health service delivery in Uganda operates on a decentralized system. In the public sector, the first point of care is a level I health centre (HC) followed by HCII, HCIII, HCIV, district hospital, Regional Referral hospital and the National referral hospital. In the private sector, the hierarchy of treatment starts from a drug shop to a clinic and then to a hospital. Additionally, traditional healers, herbalists, diviners, traditional birth attendants offer treatment to a certain section of the population mainly the rural inhabitants.

Uganda has approximately 6,940 health facilities of which 45% are government owned, 5% are private not for profit and 40% are private for profit. Different health facilities require different health cadres depending on the specialization of care. A range of disciplines ranging from nurses, midwives, clinicians, doctors and specialists provide clinical care to patients.

Notably, the country does not have a national health insurance scheme thereby having a low universal health coverage index of 49%. This poses a great risk of catastrophic health expenditure and limited access to quality care. The existing insurance schemes are privately funded and can only be afforded by the rich and well off companies.

In May 2025, the World Health Organization advised the government of Uganda to increase health-sector funding by raising per capita health expenditure from $57 to at least the WHO-recommended $86 needed to deliver essential services effectively.

== Common illnesses and treatments ==
In 2021, the leading five causes of death in Uganda were respiratory infections and tuberculosis, neglected tropical diseases and malaria, maternal and neonatal disorders, HIV/AIDS and other sexually transmitted infections, and cardiovascular diseases. The communicable and maternal conditions remain a big challenge, the rise of cardiovascular diseases reflects a growing burden of non-communicable diseases in the country. The risk factors most responsible for death and disability include child and maternal malnutrition, unprotected sexual activity, multiple sex partners, contaminated water, poor sanitation, and air pollution.

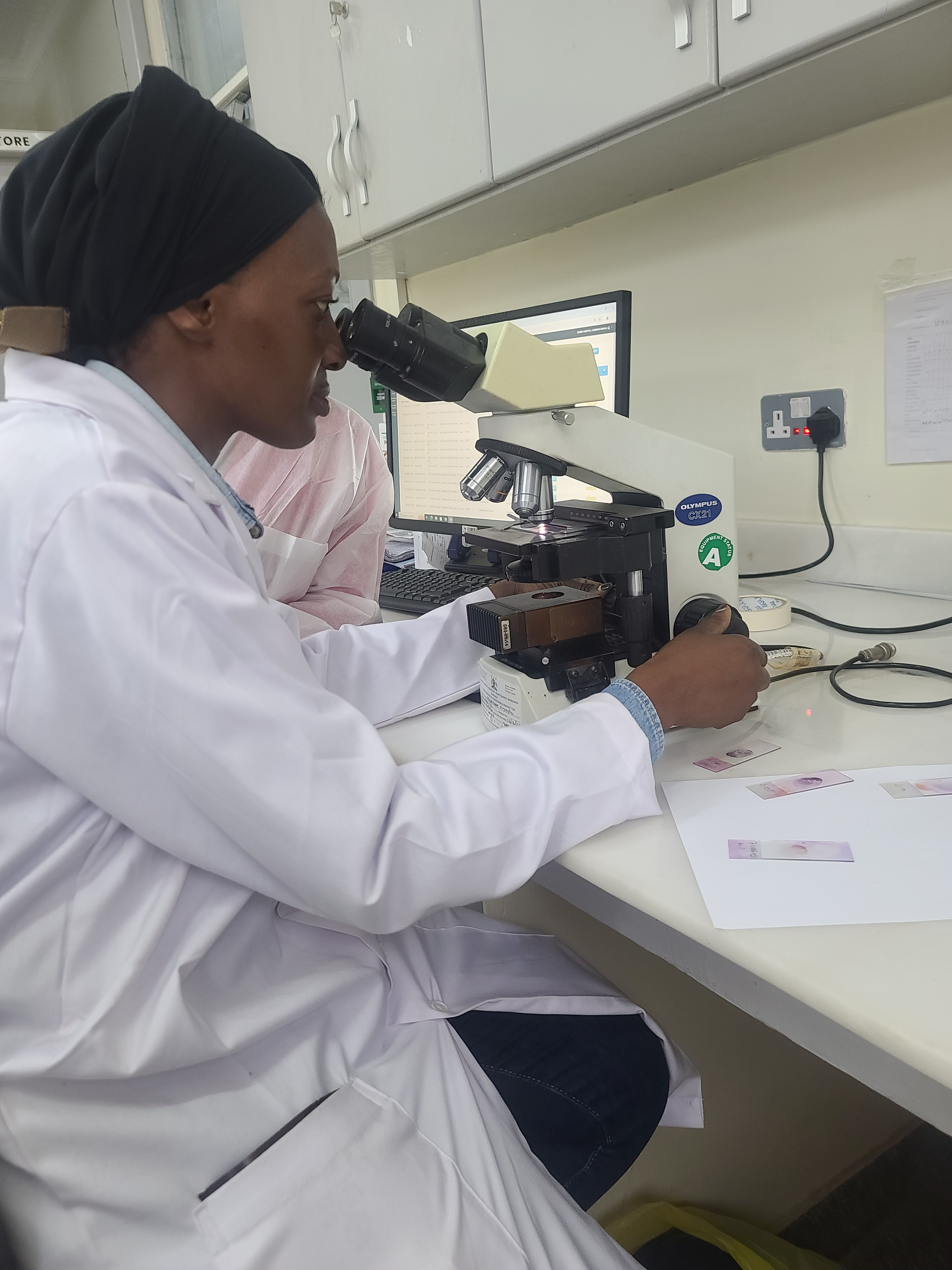
Microscopy work in a health care facility

HIV treatment in Uganda has centered on human antiretroviral therapy through cross-training and increasing the scope of health workers who can administer treatment (e.g., community health workers and nurses). This shift in treatment occurred through the WHO's 2004 "Integrated Management of Adult and Adolescent Illness" guide. Studies of HIV-infected adults in Uganda showed risky sexual behavior to have declined, contributing to the decline in HIV incidence. From 1990 to 2004, HIV rates declined by 70 percent and casual sex declined by 60 percent. Health communication was also listed as a potential cause of inducing behavioral changes in the Ugandan population. According to a 2015 study, impediments to reducing HIV incidence include food insecurity in rural areas and stigma against HIV counseling and testing.

Uganda has the highest incidence rate of malaria in the world, with 478 people out of 1000 population being afflicted per year. According to WHO data published in May 2014, malaria accounted for 19,869 deaths in Uganda (6.19% of total deaths). In 2024, malaria was still the leading cause of illness among pregnant women and children under five.

In 2002, the Ugandan government formalized the process of treating fevers through home-based care. Mothers who were able to better recognize symptoms of malaria took their children to a community medicine facility early in the illness. The Integrated Management of Childhood Illness allowed for better recognition of malaria's symptoms. Treatment either involved immediately taking the child to see a nearby healthcare worker or acquiring the treatment of chloroquine and SP, also known as Homapak, though kits have been found to be expired in some instances. However, resistance to HOMAPAK emerged, and drug recommendations by the WHO changed to artemisinin combination therapy (ACT). After the midterm review in 2014 of the national plan for malaria reduction and the malaria programme review in 2010, the national strategy to reduce malaria is being redesigned. Currently, Uganda is treating malaria through distribution of insecticide-treated nets, indoor spraying of insecticides, and preventative therapy for pregnant women. The disease burden of malaria, however, remains high and is further strengthened by inadequate resources, understanding of malaria, and increased resistance to drugs.

Uganda's first confirmed Ebola outbreak occurred in 2000. Since then, Uganda has experienced several additional outbreaks, most caused by Sudan virus, as well as Bundibugyo virus disease outbreaks in 2007 and 2026. Public-health responses to Ebola outbreaks in Uganda have included case isolation, contact tracing, infection prevention in health facilities, risk communication and, in some outbreaks, vaccine trials. Such outbreaks have also been associated with stigma against survivors and health workers, which studies have linked to misinformation, fear of lingering contagion, family rejection and reduced cooperation with outbreak-control measures.

== Malnutrition ==
In 2011, malnutrition was described as a major obstacle to development affecting all regions of the country and most groups in the population. It stated that malnutrition was limiting Uganda's human, social and economic development, and that progress in reducing it had remained slow despite major advances in economic growth and poverty reduction over the previous 20 years. During this time, nutrition indicators for young children and their mothers have only had minimal improvement, with some indicators showing a worsening trend.

Diets in Uganda have been described as low in diversity and often lacking micronutrient-rich foods. Studies have found inadequate intake of vitamin A, vitamin B-12, iron, zinc and calcium, with diets in some areas relying heavily on roots, tubers and bananas and containing limited fruit, vegetables and animal-source foods. Low fruit and vegetable consumption has also been reported in urban areas, while meat, poultry and eggs were eaten infrequently even among livestock-herding households in the cattle corridor. Also poor water, sanitation and hygiene conditions can worsen children's nutrition by affecting health and nutrient absorption. In 2018, 78% of households had access to an improved drinking-water source, but only 19% used improved toilet facilities.

=== Stunting ===
In 1995, 45% of children under five in Uganda were stunted, meaning they were short for their age. By 2006, the rate had fallen only to 39%, representing about 2.3 million young children in Uganda. The prevalence of stunting continued to decline slowly, from 33% in 2011 to 29% in 2016 and 26% in both 2022 and in 2026. Also child wasting rates have declined.

Uganda's reduction in stunting had multiple causes, but was attributed mainly to measures that affected nutrition indirectly, such as malaria-control strategies.

Child nutrition varies considerably by region in Uganda. In 2018, Tooro had the highest stunting rate, at 40.6%, while the highest wasting rates were recorded in West Nile, at 10.4%, and Karamoja, at 10.0%. Karamoja's wasting rate has been linked to poverty, food insecurity and childhood disease, while West Nile's rate may be related to its large refugee population. In Tooro, poor infant and young child feeding practices were identified as a likely factor.

=== Undernourishment ===
Uganda's undernourishment rate was 41.4% in 2015 to 2017 and had risen steadily since 2004 to 2006, indicating that a growing share of the population could not regularly meet minimum calorie needs. Food insecurity has been linked to recurrent droughts, which affect agricultural production and have become more frequent with climate change. A severe El Niño-related drought in 2015 and 2016 worsened food insecurity into 2017, with Karamoja, one of Uganda's poorest and most food-insecure regions, especially affected.

== Reproductive health ==
Reproductive health concern physical, mental, and social well-being in relation to the reproductive system. It includes access to family planning, fertility regulation, safe pregnancy and childbirth, and sexual health services.

=== Maternal and infant health ===
The World Health Organization (WHO) defines maternal health as the health of women during pregnancy, childbirth, and the postpartum period. In 2025, Uganda's total fertility rate continued to be high, at 5.2 children per woman, while 23.5% of girls aged 15 to 19 had begun childbearing.

Maternal mortality ratio in Uganda
Year	Ratio
1990	687
1995	684
2000	620
2005	504
2010	420
2015	343
2020	284
2025	189
Deaths per 100,000 live births.

The maternal mortality ratio is the annual number of female deaths per 100,000 live births from causes related to or aggravated by pregnancy or its management, excluding accidental or incidental causes. In Uganda, the ratio decreased from 687 in 1990 to 189 in 2025.

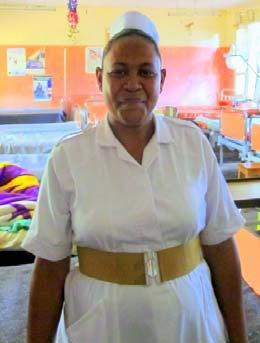
A maternal health nurse in Karamoja

In rural areas, conceiving pregnant women seek the help of traditional birth attendants (TBAs) because formal health services can be difficult or costly to access. Although TBAs are often trusted within their community, limited training and some traditional practices, have led to risky medical procedures and maternal health risks. Maternal mortality rates are also associated with low use of contraceptives, limited capacity to manage abortion and miscarriage complications, HIV/AIDS among pregnant women, and inadequate malaria prevention services.

Only 47 percent of Ugandan women receive the recommended four antenatal care visits, and only 42 percent of births are attended by skilled health personnel. Among the poorest 20 percent of the population, the share of births attended by skilled health personnel was 29 percent in 2005/2006 compared to 77 percent among the wealthiest 20 percent of the population.

The under-five mortality rate, per 1000 births is 130, and the neonatal mortality as a percentage of under-fives' mortality is 24. In Uganda, the number of midwives per 1000 live births is 7, and 1 in 35 is the lifetime risk of death for pregnant women.

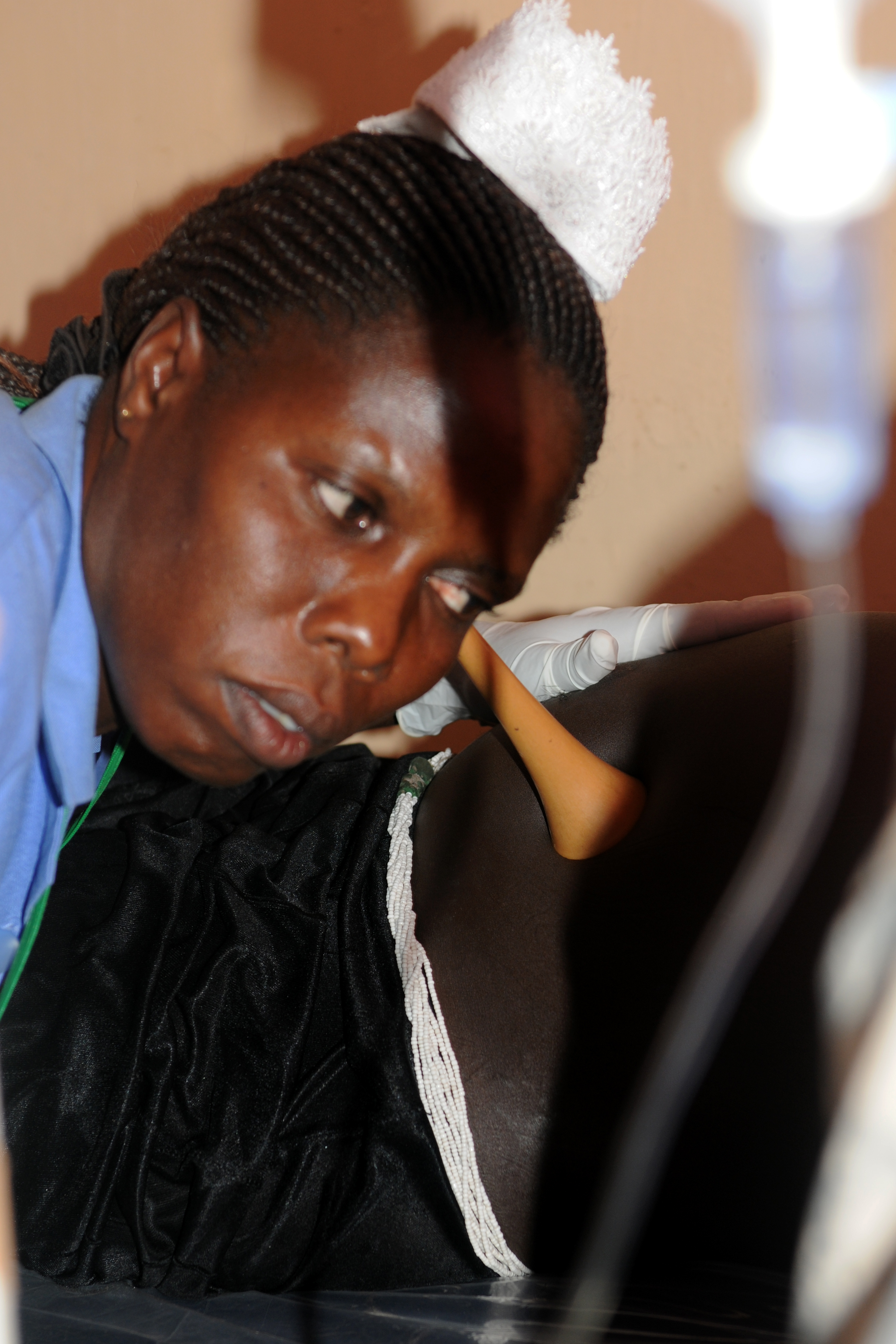
A nurse in Uganda monitoring a patient's heart rate with a Pinard horn stethoscope.

Uganda's modern contraceptive prevalence rate among women of reproductive age rose from 27.3% in 2016 to 29.8% in 2022.

=== Men's health ===
Issues affecting men including violence, sexually transmitted diseases, prostate cancers, infertility, HIV, and non-communicable diseases that affect sexual performance. The latest intervention that could improve men's sexual health is male circumcision.

=== Sexual health ===
Sexual health in Uganda is affected by the prevalence of HIV, sexually transmitted infections (STI), poor health-seeking behaviours regarding STIs, violence, and female genital mutilation that affect female sexuality in isolated communities in the north-eastern part of the country. As of 2015, Uganda's national HIV prevalence rate was 7.2 percent among adults aged 15–59 years, representing an increase from 6.7 percent in 2005. Prevention now includes voluntary male circumcision, although sexual behaviors among circumcised men need more understanding. As of April 2018, there was an estimated 1,350,000 people living with HIV/AIDS in Uganda.

Uganda is one of the three countries where randomized controlled trials were conducted to determine whether voluntary male circumcision reduces transmission of HIV from women to men.

=== Gender-based violence ===
Domestic violence (DV) is a key issue in reproductive health and rights. Most of the DV is gender-based. Physical violence is the most prevalent type of DV in Uganda, with one quarter of women reporting it. More than 60 percent of women who have ever been married have reported experiencing emotional, physical, or sexual violence from a spouse.

In 2011, about two percent of women reported to have undergone female genital mutilation, a practice that is dying away in the areas where it was more frequently practiced.

== Substance and drug use ==
Drug abuse is a significant public health concern in Uganda affecting both the child and adolescent populations. A drug commonly used among the youth is cocaine.

As of 2019, substance use disorders account for 0.34% of total disability-adjusted-life-years (DALYs) and 0.13% deaths in Uganda. Alcohol use disorders account for 0.2% of DALYs and 0.11% of total deaths. This is relatively low compared to countries in North Africa, Europe, North America and Central Asia regions. This may be a result of under reporting of these cases or failure to diagnose these disorders in Uganda.

Alcohol consumption in Uganda was reported among the top countries in the world and the highest in Africa at 12,2 liters of alcohol per capita per year in 2023. In 2016, 10% of Ugandans had an alcohol-related disorder, despite over 50% of adults having never tried alcohol. A recent study in Uganda showed an unexpected discovery of alcohol abuse and dependence among 5-8-year-old children. In this study, 7.4% children scored positive for alcohol abuse and dependence. 10 out of 148 children had high Strengths and Difficulties Questionnaire (SDQ) scores (≥ 14). These 10 children that had high SDQ scores had mental health comorbidities which included suicide attempts (30%) and separation anxiety disorders (50%). Most children reported access to homemade brew, caretaker's knowledge on drinking and difficult household situations that prompted them to take alcohol. In 2016, Uganda registered the highest number of deaths from alcohol-related liver disease with a total of 118 deaths per 100,000 from liver disease secondary to excessive alcohol consumption.

The legal regulations on alcohol in Uganda had not been updated since 1960 as of 2016 with a legal age of alcohol consumption being 18 years while alcohol sales to minors' penalty is a fine not exceeding USh 500/=($0.14) and children are allowed to buy alcohol on behalf of the adults. The Liquor Act, cap-93 still imposes fines of 205/= ($0.058) for underage alcohol consumption. A key issue on alcohol consumption in Uganda is that the alcohol industry has targeted young people through an increase in packaging of 30 ml alcohol tots/packs that are readily accessible to Ugandan youth at only 200/= ($0.057) with ongoing massive alcohol campaigns close to schools, kindergartens, media platforms, and along Ugandan roads. The Uganda National Bureau of Standards (UNBS) Act which sets standards on Ugandan commodities hasn't any standards on native liquor (commonly called "enguli"). On 26 September 2016, a new alcohol control bill was drafted by a small committee and presented to the parliament of Uganda. This bill is aimed at banning small alcohol packaging, alcohol advertising and regulating alcohol consumption time. Additionally it includes raising legal age for alcohol consumption from 18 to 21 years and an imposition of a 5% tax on all alcohol beverages. The impact and policy changes plus law enforcement will help regulate alcohol consumption in Uganda and save the lives of many youth and children.

== Oral health ==
There is inadequate data on the current oral health situation in Uganda. In 2004/2005 it was estimated that 51% of the community had experienced an oral health problem six months prior to a survey. Of the population that had experienced an oral health problem, only 35% had received treatment. The most prevalent conditions as reported by key informants included;

Results of an oral health Community Survey 2004/2005
Oral Conditions	Prevalence (%)
Tooth decay	93.1
Pain	82.1
Tooth loss	79.3
Early childhood caries	75.9
Bleeding gums	71.4
Loose teeth	48.3
Bad breath	42.9
Oral HIV lesions	28.6
Tooth bud extractions	17.2
Orofacial trauma (without fractures)	13.8
Jaw fractures	13.8
Oral cancer	10.3
Mouth sores	10.3
Fluorosis	6.9
Benign oral tumors	3.4

According to a study carried out among school children in Mbarara in 2007, the oral hygiene of school children was generally poor showing a lack of well-established oral hygiene practices. The mean decayed, missed, filled permanent teeth (DMFT) was 1.5 (±0.8SD) with females having a higher DMFT than males of 1.6 (±0.8SD) and 1.3 (±0.8SD) respectively. Children in private schools were more likely to have more caries in both permanent teeth and milk teeth. Calculus was more prevalent in males, government schools and among day scholars. Caries experience is generally higher in Kampala as compared to the rural districts. Overall DMFT score was 0.9 for children and 3.4 for adults.

According to the Global Disease Burden, oral diseases in Uganda contribute 0.38% of total disability-adjusted life years. This is lower than its neighboring countries in the East African community and much lower than the other regions, i.e., East Asia and the Pacific, Europe and Central Asia, Latin America and the Caribbean and parts of South Asia.

Uganda is unique as it trains different cadres of oral health workers, dental surgeons, public health dental officers, oral and maxillofacial surgeons and dental laboratory technologists. The dental surgeons in Uganda are regulated by the Uganda Medical and Dental Practitioners' Council (UMDPC) and a professional body, Uganda Dental Association (UDA). The number of registered dental surgeons across the country has increased from 72 dental surgeons in 2006 to about 396 dental surgeons in 2021 serving a Ugandan population of more than 42 million. Of these, 372 are general dental practitioners, 12 oral and maxillofacial surgeons, 3 orthodontists, 2 prosthodontists and 7 restorative dentists across the entire country as of 2021. All the dental specialties except for oral and maxillofacial surgery are trained outside the country.

The National Oral Health Policy has been running since 2007 through 2009 and has not yet been updated since. The Ministry of Health operates at a very low budgetary proportion covering less than 0.1% on oral health care which is suboptimal for adequate oral service delivery. The basic oral services are at a free cost at government facilities while second and tertiary care is received at a cost. Most dental care services in Uganda are out-of-pocket payments (OOPs) due to shortage of materials, supplies, equipment and manpower at most government health care units hence patients are forced to seek oral care at private facilities.

=== Infant oral mutilation (IOM) ===
Infant oral mutilation (IOM) is very common to most African countries in Sub-Saharan Africa, Uganda inclusive. Among the Bantu-speaking tribes in Uganda, it's commonly known as "ebinyo". The unerupted tooth is gouged out usually as a cure for high fevers and diarrhea in infants by un-trained personnel. The practice involves identifying raised areas on the infants' gums and using sharp instruments to extract the soft non-mineralized tooth considering it the "offending worm." The common tooth buds removed are the primary canines.

IOM was first reported in Uganda in 1969 among 16.1% of children from the Acholi tribe in the Northern part of Uganda. These were all missing canine teeth due to IOM. A recent study published in 2019 among 3-5-year-old children in the Western part of Uganda revealed 8.1% were missing primary canines due to IOM. This practice is more common among the rural populations versus the urban populations, with more prevalence in children under a caretaker other than a parent. The most common groups reported to carry out IOM are culturally respected people in Uganda and these include; traditional healers, traditional midwives, school teachers and local priests. This practice is carried out at an age where the child's antibodies from breast milk and pregnancy are decreasing hence increased susceptibility to infections manifesting as fevers, diarrhea and vomiting that IOM is performed to treat. This leads to neglection of the primary cause of infections and instead exacerbates it through use of unsterile instruments leading to high morbidity and mortality among children. The main cause of IOM is poor oral health literacy among majority of the Ugandan population.

== Mental health ==
In Uganda, mental-health disorders affect a substantial proportion of the population: a 2022 analysis estimated that nearly one in three Ugandans (≈ 32%) suffer from a mental illness at some point in their lives. In the 2024 National Household Survey, around 5.5 million people nationwide, which is about 12% of the population, were identified as facing probable mental-health challenges. Despite the widespread need, the country faces a critical shortage of psychiatrists and mental-health infrastructure: at the main national psychiatric referral centre, Butabika National Referral Hospital in Kampala, admissions have surged in recent years, placing a heavy burden on Uganda’s only full-scale psychiatric hospital.

Rural districts such as Buyende District are particularly under-served: decentralisation policies have often failed to translate into functional mental-health services at the community level, and many local health centres lack specialized staff and resources. In this context, non-governmental initiatives can play an important role: for example, Empower Through Health (ETH) operates a health-centre in Mpunde village, providing psychiatric services in a district where formal mental-health care is otherwise minimal.

== Physical activity ==
Uganda was the most physically active nation in the world in 2018 according to the World Health Organization. Only 5.5% of Ugandans do not achieve 150 minutes of moderate-to-intense or 75 minutes of rigorous activity per week. Most work is still very physical, and commuting by vehicle is beyond the reach of most of the population. Kampala, however, is not friendly towards walking or cycling, and the air is very polluted. The Kampala Capital City Authority established the country's first cycle lane—500 metres in Kololo—in 2018.

== Vulnerable populations and regions ==
=== Refugees ===
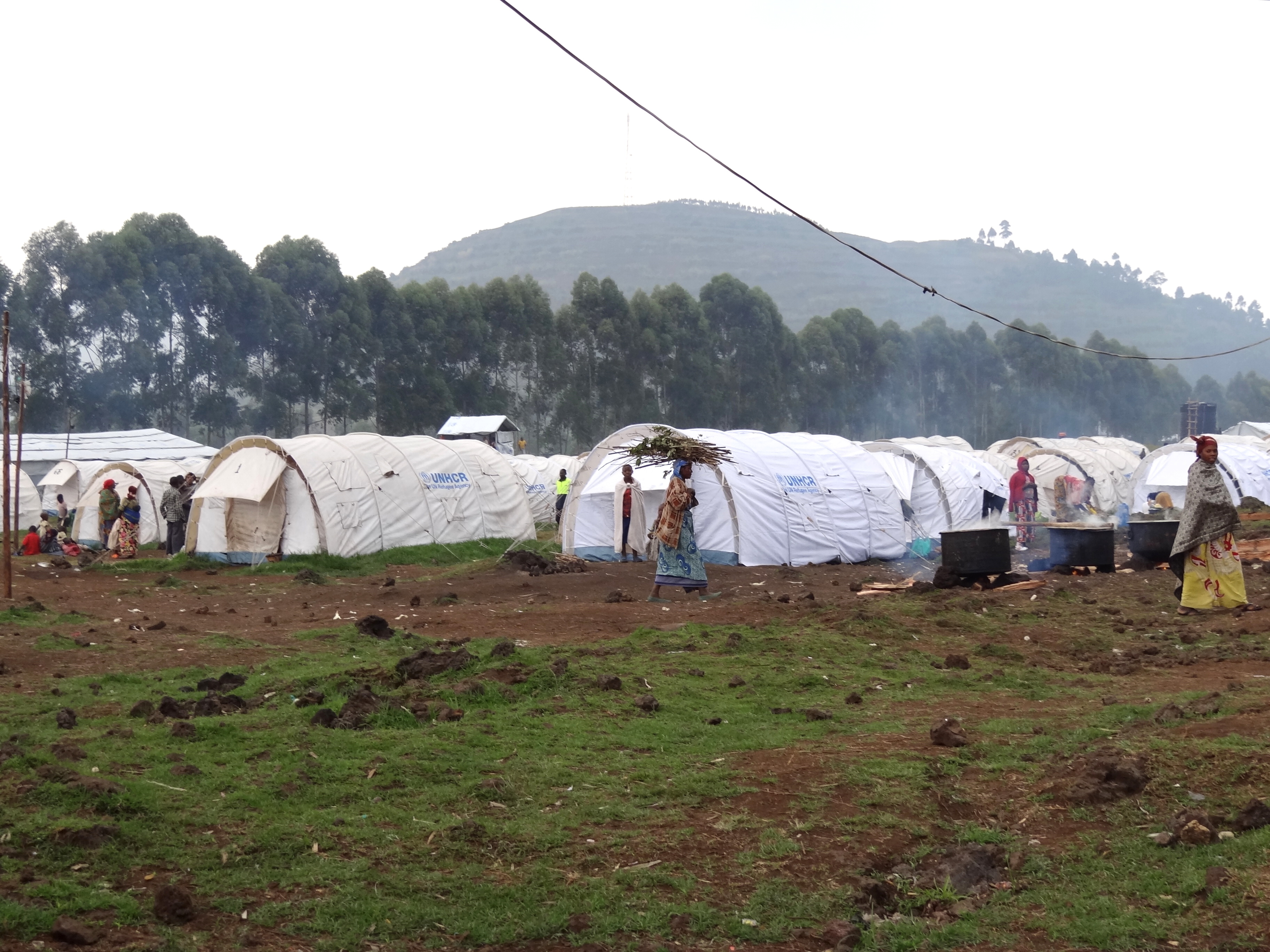
Nyakabanda Transit Center for Congolese refugees, outside Kisoro in Southwestern Uganda

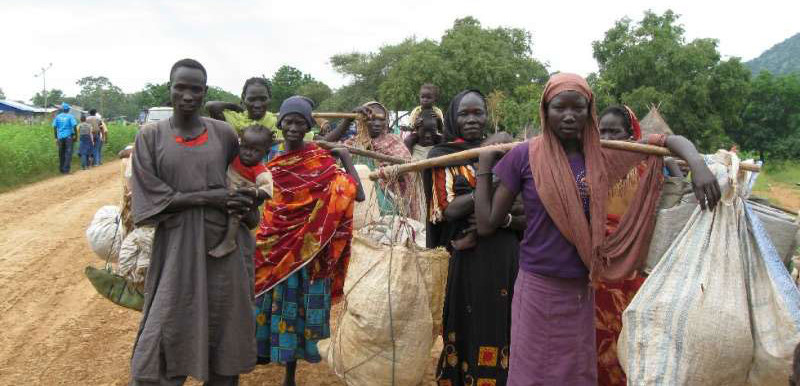
Refugees in Bambasi Refugee Camp

Uganda has been hosting refugees and asylum seekers since achieving its independence in 1962. By October 2025, Uganda hosted roughly 1.95 million refugees, more than any other country in Africa. Most were rural groups mainly from South Sudan and the Democratic Republic of the Congo, as well as from Somalia, Burundi, and Rwanda. From 2023, more than 90,000 refugees fleeing the civil war in Sudan have entered. For years, Uganda's refugee policy has been cited as a progressive international model. Since 2022, however, rising demand for humanitarian assistance and declining funding have placed the system under severe pressure, with health services among the most affected.

In 2025, refugee settlements in Uganda recorded several disease outbreaks, while shortages of essential medicines and medical supplies affected as much as 30% of stock, reducing the capacity of health facilities to provide care. Across 12 of the country's 14 refugee-hosting locations, acute malnutrition increased from 5.4% to 7.8%, increasing risks to newborns, children, and mothers. Funding cuts also reduced disease surveillance and immunisation, raising the risk of vaccine-preventable outbreaks, including measles, while cholera and mpox responses continue.

There are regular outbreaks of diseases such as cholera, ebola and marburg. The policy of allowing refugees to freely move within the country increases the risk of spreading these outbreaks beyond refugee camp borders.

=== Northern Region ===
Northern Uganda is one of the four major administrative regions in Uganda. The region was devastated by a protracted civil war between the government of Uganda and the Lords Resistance Army as well as the cattle rustling conflict that lasted for 20 years.

Since the war ended in 2006, the internally displaced person camps have been destroyed and people have resettled back to their former homesteads. The region, however, still has many health challenges, such as poor health care infrastructure and inadequate staffing at all levels (2008 published report); lack of access to the national electricity grid (2007 published report); an inability to attract and retain qualified staff; frequent stock outs in the hospitals and health facilities; emerging and re-emerging diseases such as Ebola, nodding syndrome, onchocerciasis, and tuberculosis; proneness to malaria epidemics, the leading cause of death in the country; reintegration of former abducted child soldiers who returned home (2007 study); lack of safe drinking water as most boreholes were destroyed during the war; the HIV/AIDS epidemic (2004 published report); poor education standards with high failure rates in primary and secondary school national examinations (2015 published report); and poverty (2013 published report).

==== Health indicators ====
According to the 2015 Uganda Bureau of Statistics (UBOS) report, the Northern Region, which hosts the largest share of refugees, shows the following health indicators:

- The region has one of the highest HIV prevalence rates of 8 percent in the country, second only to Kampala.
- The region leads in poverty with 80 percent of households living below poverty line compared to only 20 percent of the country in general living in poverty. The region has the lowest per capita house hold expenditure of USh.21,000/= compared to USh.30,000/= of the general population. Up to 26 percent of people are chronically poor
- The region leads in illiteracy with only 60 percent of the population aged 10 years and above being literate compared to 71 percent of the general country population.
- Most districts in the region lack clean piped water supply with the exception of a few urban centers like Gulu, Lira, Arua, and Soroti. The pit latrine coverage ranges from 4 to 84 percent in some districts, the worst in the country.
- The region has the lowest numbers of health facilities compared to other regions of the country. Of the total 5,229 health facilities in Uganda (2,867 operated by the government, 874 operated by non-governmental organizations (NGOs), and 1,488 private facilities), there are only 788 health facilities in the Northern Region (664 operated by government, 122 operated by NGOs, and 2 private facilities). Health facility deliveries range from 7 percent in Amudat, to 81 percent in Gulu.
- The region has the highest total fertility rate of 7.9 children per woman compared to the nationwide 6.1 rate.
- The Karamoja sub-region has high maternal mortality ratios. According to the 2001 Uganda Demographic and Health Survey, the Northern Region was the worst in infant child mortality indicators (under age five mortality: 178 deaths per 1000 live births) (under age one mortality: 105 deaths per 1000 live births) (neonatal mortality: 42 deaths within the first month of life per 1000 live births). For purposes of the 2011 Uganda Demographic and Health Survey, the Northern Region was subdivided into West Nile, North, and Karamoja, with the other three regions having seven subdivisions, for a total of ten subdivisions nationwide. Karamoja's under age five mortality rate (153 deaths per 1000 live births) was the worst in the country, with West Nile's rate (125) the third worst and the North's rate (105) the fourth best. West Nile's under age one mortality rate (88) was the worst in the country, with Karamoja's rate (87) the second worst and the North's rate (66) the fifth best. West Nile's under one month mortality rate (38) was the second worst in the country, with the North's rate (31) tied for fourth worst and Karamoja's rate (29) being the fourth best.
- Nodding syndrome hit the region during the early to mid-2000s, although the international community did not become aware of it until 2009 when the WHO and the US Centers for Disease Control and Prevention first investigated it. The disease affected children aged 5–15 years, mainly in the Acholi sub-region and a few in the Lango sub-region. Over 3,000 confirmed cases were documented as of 2012, with Uganda having the highest number of cases in the world. The disease has profound health effects on children, families, and communities. The children who were previously healthy and growing well are observed by the parents to nod mainly at meal times initially, progressing to head nod when it is cold, etc. These children eventually develop various forms of epileptic seizures as well as disabilities such as severe malnutrition, burns, contractures, severe kyphosis, cognitive impairment, and wandering away from homes. Since the interventions began in 2012, there have been no new cases reported in the region. The exact cause of this disease has not been found, although there is strong association with onchocerciasis. Communities believe their children could have been exposed to chemicals during the war, particularly when they were displaced into internally displaced persons camps because they observed that their children became sick only when in the camps.

Sub County	Nodding S	Nodding S	Epilepsy	Epilepsy
	Male	Female	Male	Female
Awere	230	188	231	198
Atanga	144	129	95	84
Lapul	34	32	23	22
Agagura	119	108	70	64
Laguti	172	164	115	110
Acholi Bur	03	04	18	23
Puranga	13	12	148	146
Pader	13	11	21	16
Total	728	648	721	663

== Environmental risks to health ==
=== Air pollution ===
Air pollution is one of the critical risk factor for non-communicable diseases in Uganda. Globally, air pollution is responsible for about 18% of all adult deaths from stroke, 27% from heart disease, 20% from Chronic obstructive pulmonary disease (COPD), 27% are due to pneumonia and 8% from lung cancer, WHO estimates show. A total of about 13,000 people died from air pollution in Uganda in 2017 and 10,000 of the deaths were due to inhaling toxic fumes from indoor wood and charcoal burning cookstoves household air pollution figures from the Health Effects Institute (HEI), Institute for Health Metrics and Evaluation (IHME) and World Health Organization (WHO) reveal. In 2019, it was the year when Kampala was reported to have the highest air pollution where the months that stood out as the most polluted were February, July and August, all of which came in with PM2.5 readings of 36.9 μg/m³, 39.9 μg/m³ and 37.4 μg/m³ respectively with black carbon and volatile organic compounds (VOC's) being the most pollutant.

In 2019, Dr Daniel Okello, the KCCA director of Public Health and Environment also reported about 31,600 people die in Uganda from air pollution-related diseases annually like heart disease, chronic obstructive pulmonary disease and lung cancer, and most fatalities are in dusty communities, industrial and commercial areas, that have too many cars gushing fumes and dust. Research conducted by Makerere University suggests that an increase in the number of old vehicles on roads has led to the deterioration of the air quality far beyond the World Health Organization's recommended levels. Air pollution is fundamentally altering climate, with profound impacts on the health of not only of Uganda but the planet at large and it is driven by rapid urbanization and population growth in urban areas.

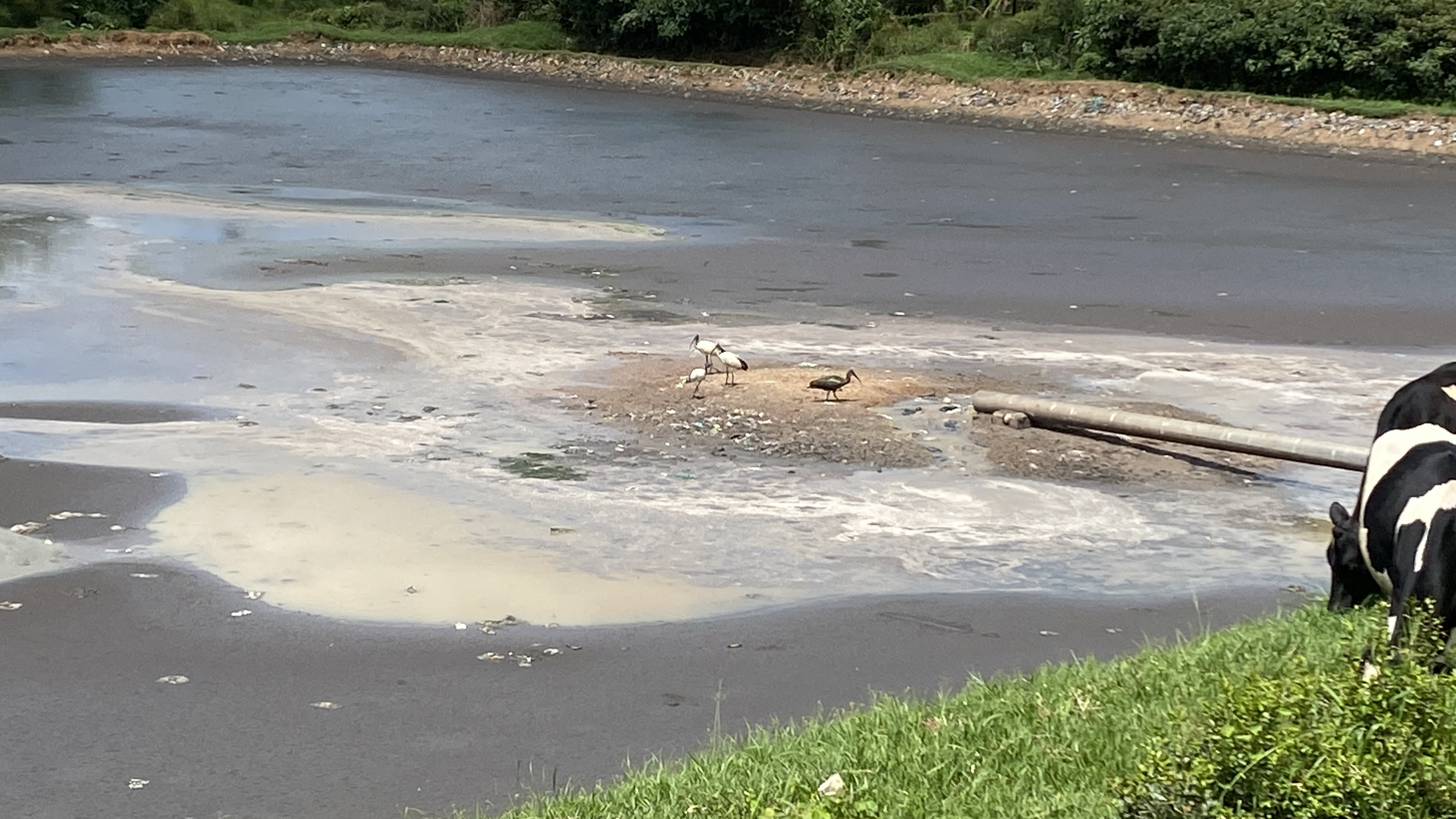
Cows eating grass near sewage ponds of Katete in Mbarara in western Uganda

=== Water access and pollution ===
In Uganda, an estimate of about 7 million of Ugandans lack access to safe water and about 28 millions of the population do not have sufficient access to sanitation facilities. In 2022, it was reported by The Joint Monitoring Programme (JMP), the United Nations and World Health Organization's (WHO) that 9 percent of the Ugandan population depends on unimproved or surface water for their daily needs. In Kampala, the major cause of water pollution is the presence of pathogenic bacteria in the springs and presence of nitrates as found out by researchers. This is said to be caused by poor waste management and badly designed pit latrines. Children between the ages of 12 and 14 that have come into contact with nitrates-containing water are reported to have delayed response to light and sound stimuli. Diarrhoea alone, one of the effects of clean water inaccessibility and one of three major childhood killers in Uganda, kills 33 children every day, UNICEF reports. There is as well a lot of plastic waste in Lake Victoria. Polyethene and plastic bottles, often used in bags, wrappers and films, contributes 60% of analyzed microplastic particles, thus making it the biggest of the plastic pollutants of Lake Victoria.

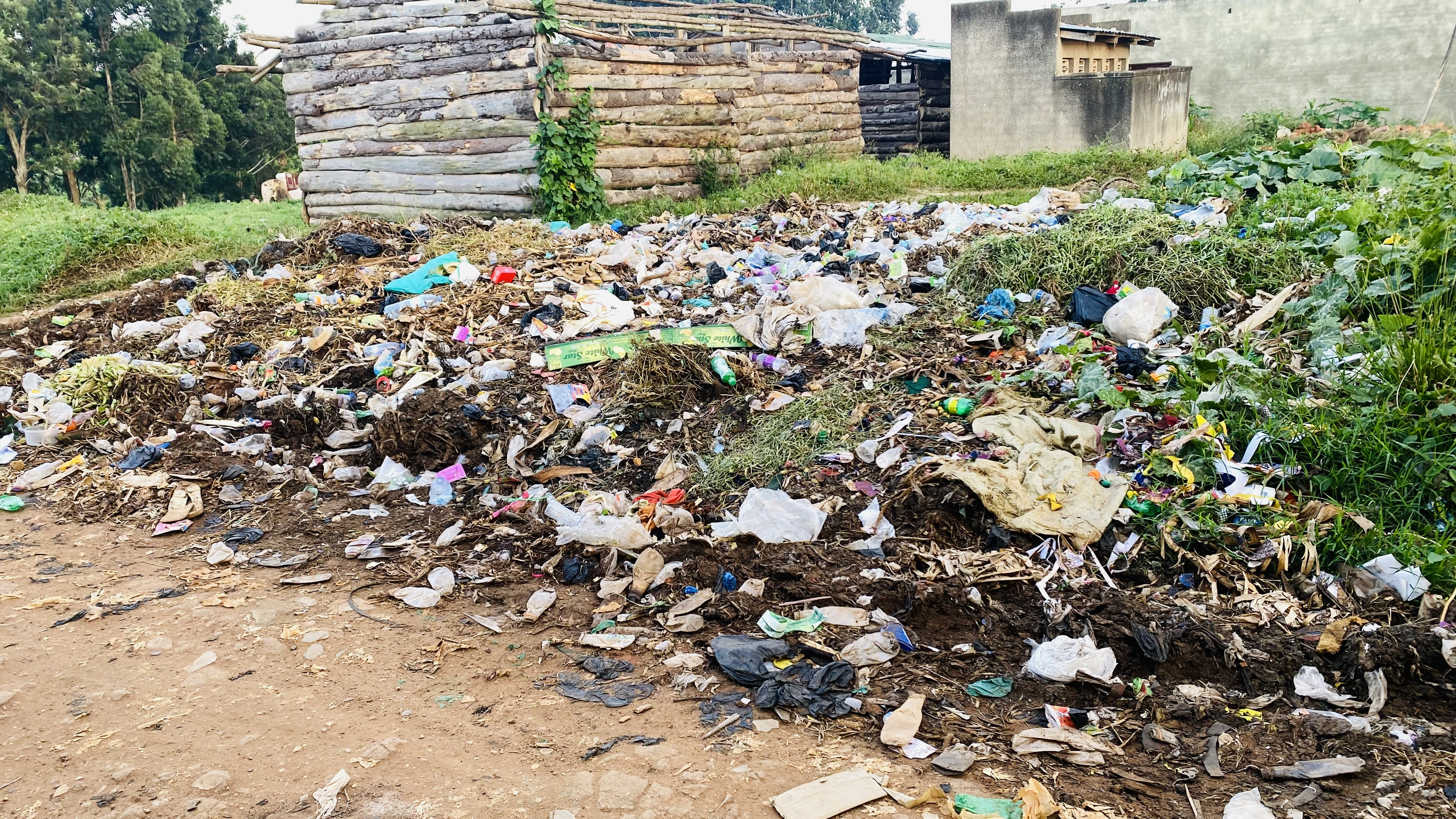
Polythene bags and other plastic waste dumped openly in Kyarushozi town in Kyenjojo District in Uganda

=== Plastic pollution affecting soil and water ===
Plastic pollution is an increasing environmental problem in Uganda, linked to climate change concerns and risks to public health and sustainability. Plastic pollution affects both soil and water quality in Uganda. Although the government has repeatedly introduced bans on single-use plastic bags, enforcement has been unevenly enforced and largely unsuccessful. Most plastic waste in Uganda consists of single-use, non-biodegradable products. Plastic bags continue to be widely used, and burned or released into the environment, where they can clog drainage systems, build up in water bodies, cause floodings, and become incorporated into agricultural soils. Over time, plastic waste can break down into microplastics, with possible effects on soil structure, water-holding capacity, nutrient movement in soil, crops, livestock, and human food systems.

=== Effects of climate change ===
A 2020 report warned that climate change was expecting to increase health risks in Uganda through more frequent and intense droughts, floods and shifting rainfall patterns. Flooding can pollute sources of drinking water with pathogens and other contaminants that can lead to water-related diseases such as typhoid and cholera. Droughts can reduce access to safe water. Heavy rainfall can create standing water, which provides breeding sites for mosquitoes and can increase the spread of vector-borne diseases such as malaria. The report also cited reduced availability of herbal medicines, decline in biodiversity contributing to malnutrition, and an increase in pests as direct health effects of climate change.

A 2024 report placed Uganda among the countries most vulnerable to climate change, placing it 173rd out of 185 countries on the Notre Dame Global Adaptation Index for vulnerability and readiness. In August 2024, Uganda published a Vulnerability and Adaptation Assessment and a Climate Change Health National Adaptation Plan (H-NAP) for 2025-2030. The documents were intended to identify climate-related health risks and guide measures to reduce them. The H-NAP sets out measures based on the WHO framework for climate-resilient health systems. These include climate-smart governance, training for health workers, the use of climate information in health programmes, and partnerships to support funding.

Reported challenges to Uganda's climate-health response included insufficient early funding, while ongoing health priorities such as infectious diseases and maternal and child health drew attention and resources away from climate-health initiatives. Other challenges included weak integration of climate change into health policy discussions and a lack of health-sector emissions data.

== See also ==
- Water supply and sanitation in Uganda
- Child health in Uganda
- HIV/AIDS in Uganda
- COVID-19 pandemic in Uganda

== Notes ==
- UBOS and ICF International. Uganda Demographic and Health Survey 2011. Kampala, Uganda and Calverton, Maryland: Uganda Bureau of Statistics (UBOS) and ICF International Inc., 2012
- Uganda Bureau of Statistics (UBOS) and Macro International Inc. Uganda Demographic and Health Survey 2006. Calverton, Maryland, US: UBOS and Macro International Inc, 2007
- MOH and ICF International. Uganda AIDS Indicator Survey 2011. Kampala, Uganda and Calverton Maryland, US: Ministry of Health and ICF International, 2012
- MOH and ORC Macro. Uganda HIV/AIDS Sero-behavioural Survey 2004–2005. Calverton, Maryland, US: Ministry of Health and ORC Macro, 2006.
- Government of Uganda MOH. Safe Male Circumcision Policy. In: Ministry of Health, editor. Kampala 2010
