= Brian Gitta =

Ugandan technology entrepreneur and inventor

- Born: 1994 (age 31–32); Uganda
- Education: Makerere University
- Occupations: Technology entrepreneur, inventor
- Organization: thinkIT Limited
- Known for: Developing Matibabu, a prototype non-invasive malaria diagnostic device
- Awards: Royal Academy of Engineering Africa Prize for Engineering Innovation (2018); Rolex Awards for Enterprise Laureate (2019); TIME Next Generation Leaders (2019)

Brian Gitta (born in 1994) is a Ugandan technology entrepreneur and inventor known for his work in health technology and digital innovation.

He is the co-founder of thinkIT Limited which is a Ugandan technology company known for developing Matibabu, a prototype device designed to support malaria diagnosis using non-invasive methods.

Gitta is the first Ugandan and youngest winner of the Royal Academy of Engineering’s Africa Prize for Engineering Innovation which he won in 2018. He was also named a Rolex Awards for Enterprise Laureate in 2019 and recognized as one of TIME's Next Generation Leaders.

== Career ==
Gitta co-founded thinkIT Limited, a technology company involved in developing digital solutions for organizations in areas including health, agriculture, and public services. In 2014, Gitta and a team of researchers developed Matibabu. The device uses optical sensing technology to analyze changes associated with malaria infection. The project attracted attention as an example of locally developed health technology innovation in Uganda.

== Recognition ==
In June 2018, Gitta and his team won the Africa Prize for Engineering Innovation in Nairobi, receiving £25,000 in prize money for the development of Matibabu.

In 2019 he was selected as one of five Rolex Awards for Enterprise Laureates for his work on rapid, non-invasive malaria testing. The same year, TIME magazine included him among its Next Generation Leaders.

== See also ==
- Healthcare in Uganda
- Matibabu
