= Rebecca Alitwala Mubezi =

Ugandan former Miss Tourism of 2017 and social advocate

- Born: Rebecca Alitwala Mubezi
- Other name: Young Lioness
- Occupations: Beauty pageant title holder, Activist, Humanitarian
- Organization: Becky's Child Foundation
- Known for: Girl and women advocacy; Disability advocacy; Fighting kidney disease
- Notable work: Advocacy for girls and women; Disability inclusion; Community health initiatives
- Title: Miss Tourism Busoga 2017

Rebecca Alitwala Mubezi is a Ugandan beauty pageant title holder and activist)/humanitarian often referred to as the "young lioness". Well known for her girl/women advocacy, disability advocacy and fighting Kidney disease. She is among Miss Tourism Busoga 2017.

== Career history ==
She is the chief executive officer of Becky's Child Foundation that focuses on children with disabilities.

During the Mustard Seed Secondary School Busota Girls Empowerment outreach, Rebecca emphasized the need for collective and committed effort to protect and empower girls through gender-responsive policies, affirmative action, and the creation of economic and educational opportunities. During an outreach where Rebecca Kadaga officiated, Rebecca emphasized the need for mentorship, protection, and inclusion of vulnerable children and pledged to seek more resources for similar health initiatives and Rebecca Kadaga commended non governmental organisations including Becky's Child Foundation for championing community health and children’s rights. During mother's day in 2025, she donated mobility aids to vulnerable children in Buyende in order to uplift mothers who take care of children with special needs but not supported and yet in silence.

== Pageantry ==
Miss Tourism Busoga 2017.

She won the Miss Tourism for Busoga in 2017.

== See also ==
- Miss Tourism Uganda
- Just Like My Child Foundation
- Laura Kanushu
- Empower Through Health
