= Agnes Kiragga =

Researcher

Agnes Kiragga is a Ugandan biostatistitian research scientist and the data science technical lead at the African Health Population Research Council in Nairobi. Dr Agnes conducts research studies on data science, machine learning and artificial intelligence at the intersection of population health in Africa. She is the principal investigator on projects and her role is to find out the role of climate on health using data science as well as analyzing datasets to find solutions for public health concerns in Africa with a focus on the developments of data models that support data sharing and application of artificial intelligence and data science techniques to improve global health and livelihoods in Africa. She is a co-founder of the African Women in Science Hub.

== Career ==
Dr. Agnes holds a PhD in applied statistics from Makerere University, and a Post Doctoral Fellowship Certificate from the Johns Hopkins University in the United States of America. She has worked as the head of Statistics and Management at Infectious Disease Institute at the College of Health Sciences at Makerere University in Kampala, and the current chair for Representative Council of International Biometric Society. In her work, she builds capacity of Data Science professionals through out Africa through the Global Partnership for Sustainable Development Goals. Dr. Agnes also supports the HASH project and Sub grantees as the technical personnel. She has authored publications on research and is published on online research platforms like Research Gate.

== Awards ==
Dr. Agnes received the Titan Award for Community Support in recognition of her work as a biometrician.

== See Also ==
- Aminah Zawedde
- Annet Kirabo
- Lydia Mugherera
- Florence Muranga
