= Healthcare in Uganda =

Uganda's health system is composed of health services delivered to the public sector, by private providers, and by traditional and complementary health practitioners. It also includes community-based health care and health promotion activities.

== Structure of health system ==
The not-for-profit providers are run on a national and local basis and 78% are religiously based. Three main providers include the Uganda Catholic Medical Bureau, Uganda Protestant Medical Bureau, and the Uganda Muslim Medical Bureau. Nongovernmental organizations have emerged as the prominent not-for-profit organizations for HIV/AIDS counseling and treatment. The for-profit providers include clinics and informal drug stores. Formal providers include medical and dental practitioners, nurses and midwives, pharmacies, and allied health professionals. Traditional providers include herbalists, spiritual healers, traditional birth attendants, hydro therapists, etc.

Uganda's health system is divided into national and district-based levels. At the national level are the national referral hospitals, regional referral hospitals, and semi-autonomous institutions including the Uganda Blood Transfusion Services, the Uganda National Medical Stores, the Uganda Public Health Laboratories, the Uganda Virus Research Institute and the Uganda National Health Research Organization (UNHRO). The aim of Uganda's health system is to deliver the national minimum health care package. Uganda runs a decentralized health system with national and district levels.

The lowest rung of the district-based health system consists of Village Health Teams (VHTs). These are volunteer community health workers who deliver predominantly health education, preventive services, and simple curative services in communities. They constitute level 1 health services. The next level is Health Center II, which is an out patient service run by a nurse. It is intended to serve 5000 people. Next in level is Health Center III (HCIII) which serves 10,000 people and provides in addition to HC II services, in patient, simple diagnostic, and maternal health services. It is managed by a clinical officer. Above HC III is the Health Center IV, run by a medical doctor and providing surgical services in addition to all the services provided at HC III. HC IV is also intended to provide blood transfusion services and comprehensive emergency obstetric care.

In terms of governance, the MOH is currently implementing the Health Sector Strategic and Investment Plan (HSSIP), which is the third iteration of health sector strategies. The MOH coordinates stakeholders and is responsible for planning, budgeting, policy formulation, and regulation.

According to a 2006 published report, the health sector at the district and sub-district level is governed by the district health management team (DHMT). The DHMT is led by the district health officer (DHO) and consists of managers of various health departments in the district. The heads of health sub-districts (HC IV managers) are included on the DHMT. The DHMT oversees implementation of health services in the district, ensuring coherence with national policies. A Health Unit Management Committee (HUMC) composed of health staff, civil society, and community leaders is charged with linking health facility governance with community needs.

In addition, the Uganda Medical Association (UMA) seeks to "provide programs that support the social welfare and professional interests of medical doctors in Uganda and to promote universal access to quality health and health care." However, the government's failure to improve the compensation of doctors, as well as failing to conduct a review of the supply of medicines and other equipment in health centres across the country, led to a UMA strike in November 2017, effectively paralysing Uganda's health system.

== Health system reforms ==
At the beginning of the 21st century, the government of Uganda began implementing a series of health sector reforms that were aimed at improving the poor health indicators prevailing at the time. A Sector-Wide Approach (SWAp) was introduced in 2001 to consolidate health financing. Another demand side reform introduced in the same year was the abolition of user fees at public health facilities, which triggered a surge in outpatient attendances across the country.

Decentralization of health services began in the mid-1990s alongside wider devolution of all public administration, and was sealed in 1998 with the definition of the health sub-district. Implementation of the health sub district concept extended into the early 2000s.

To improve medicines management and availability, the government of Uganda made medicines available to private-not-for-profit (PNFP) providers. With decentralization of health services, a "pull" system was instituted in which district and health facility managers were granted autonomy to procure medicines they needed in the required quantities from the national medical stores, within pre-set financial earmarks. The result was better availability of medicines.

== Health system performance and financing ==
Life expectancy at birth in Uganda

A comprehensive review of Uganda's Health System conducted in 2011 by USAID uncovered strengths and weaknesses of the health system, organized around the six technical building blocks of health system that were defined by the WHO. In summary, the assessment found that whereas significant efforts are being implemented to qualitatively and quantitatively improve health in Uganda, more needs to be done to focus on the poor, improve engagement of the private-for-profit sector, enhance efficiency, strengthen stakeholder coordination, improve service quality, and stimulate consumer-based advocacy for better health.

The Ministry of Health (MOH) also conducts annual health sector performance appraisals that assess health system performance and monitor progress in delivery of the UNMHCP. The 2011 USAID report assessing Uganda's health care system pointed to the fact that the UNMHCP often sets health sector targets and activities without an adequate analysis of the costs involved or the implementation of measures to allocate required resources appropriately.

A number of factors affect the quality of services in Uganda, including the shortage of healthcare workers and lack of trust in them, a lack of needed treatments, high costs, and long distances to facilities. In 2009, a survey conducted of Ugandan patients indicated a decline in the performance of the public sector health services. These were indicated through comments about poor sanitation, a lack of professionals and drugs and equipment, long wait times, inadequate preventative care, a poor referral system, rude health workers, and lack of services for vulnerable populations like the poor and elderly. The quality of services affects utilization in different ways, including preventing patients from seeking out delivery services or leading them to see traditional providers, self-medicate, and decide not to seek formal care or seeing private providers.

Total public and private health expenditure per capita was US$59 in 2013. Public financing for health was 4.3 percent of GDP in 2013, well below the target of 15 percent set in the 2001 Abuja Declaration.

== Health workforce ==
There is a significant shortage of health workers in Uganda. A Human Resources for Health Policy is in place to guide recruitment, deployment, and retention of health staff. In spite of this, shortages of health workers persist. According to a 2009 published report, there is one doctor for every 7,272 Ugandans. The related statistic is 1:36,810 for nurse/midwifery professionals. The shortages are worse in rural areas where 80 percent of the population resides, as 70 percent of all doctors are practicing in urban areas. There are 61 institutions that train health workers, with five medical colleges, twenty-seven allied health training schools, and twenty nine nursing schools.

Community health worker training has increased since the 2000s. The Ugandan Ministry of Health implemented the Village Health Teams (VHT) Training Program to develop community health workers who connect rural communities to health facilities and aid in the spread of preventative knowledge about malaria, pneumonia, worm infestations, diarrhea, and neglected tropical disease.^{[17]} VHTs have also aided in health campaigns and disease surveillance. Nongovernmental organizations, such as Health Child Uganda and Omni Med, have also been working with the Ministry of Health to train and maintain VHTs.^{[18]}

An assessment of VHT abilities led to the creation of a Community Health Extension Worker (CHEW) Program, which involves the training of health workers for a year in all districts of the nation.^{[17]}Unlike VHTs, CHEWs will possess elevated skills in addressing the health needs of their communities, will be based at the Health Center II level.^{[17]} The CHEW program is planned for implementation in 2017 and 2018.^{[17]}

== Service delivery ==
In 2006, there were 3,237 health facilities in Uganda. Seventy-one percent were public entities, 21 percent were not-for-profit organizations, and 9 percent were for-profit. The doubling in public and not-for-profit facilities was primarily driven by the government's initiative to improve access to services. However, 68 percent of these services are located in the capital Kampala and the surrounding central region, while rural areas face a gross shortage of such facilities.

According to the Uganda National Household Survey 2012/2013, the majority of those who sought health care first visited a private hospital orclinic (37 percent) or a government health centre (35 percent). Twenty-two percent of the urban population used government health centers, while that proportion rose to 39 percent in the rural areas. Thirty-five percent of government health centers visited by persons who fell sick were within a radius of 5 kilometres (3 mi) from the population.

=== Speech therapy ===
Speech therapy in Uganda is a growing but still underserved field, with demand for services far exceeding availability. According to the World Health Organization, up to 10% of children worldwide experience some form of communication disorder, and Uganda is no exception. Yet, Uganda has fewer than 100 trained speech and language therapists serving a population of over 45 million people. This severe shortage means that many children with conditions such as autism, speech delays, hearing impairments, and cleft palate go without professional support, particularly in rural areas where therapy services are scarce.

Despite the challenges, awareness is increasing, and access is slowly improving. For example, reports show that strokes are the third leading cause of disability in Uganda, with thousands of survivors each year experiencing speech and swallowing difficulties that require therapy. Additionally, the number of children diagnosed with autism and developmental delays has risen significantly, leading to greater demand for intervention services in schools and hospitals. As training programs expand and NGOs collaborate with local health institutions, the future of speech therapy in Uganda looks promising, offering hope to families who previously had little or no access to such essential care.

== Fertility rate and family planning ==
Uganda has the second-highest fertility rate in the East African Community, behind only Burundi. According to 2014 data, a Ugandan woman, on average, gives birth to 5.8 children during her lifetime compared to 7.1 in 1969 and 6.8 in 2001. The age-specific fertility rates indicate that fertility peaks when women are aged between 20 and 24 years and then declines slowly until age 34. According to 2011 data, the fertility rate in urban areas (3.8 per woman) was significantly lower than in rural areas (6.7 per woman).

Based on 2012 data, 30 percent of married Ugandan women are using some method of contraception, with 26 percent using modern contraceptive methods (MCM), such as female and male sterilization, pill, intrauterine device, injectables, implants, male condom, diaphragm, and the lactational amenorrhea method. MCM were used by only 8 percent of married Ugandan women in 1995. There is a gap between the demand for contraception and the amount of contraception being made available. Several organisations are providing health education and contraceptive services.

== Antenatal care, facility deliveries, and postnatal care ==
Antenatal care (ANC) coverage in Uganda in 2011 was almost universal with more than 95 percent of women attending at least one visit. Only 48 percent of women, however, attended the recommended four visits. Deliveries in health facilities accounted for about 57 percent of all deliveries, far below the number of women who attend at least one ANC visit. That percentage had risen from 41 percent between 2006 and 2011.

Only one-third of women received postnatal care (PCN) in the first two days after delivery. In 2011, only two percent of mothers received a PNC check up in the first hour for all births in two years before the 2011 Uganda Demographic Household Survey.

Uganda Trends in Selected SRH indicators
Indicator	1980	1995	2000	2006	2011
Births attended by skilled health staff (% of total)		38	39	42	58
Maternal mortality ratio	435	561	505	435	438
Contraceptive Prevalence rate			19	24	30
Unmet Need for Family Planning			35	41	34
Total fertility rate	7.1	7.1	6.9	6.7	6.2
HIV Prevalence (% of Adult Population)		10.2	7.3	6.7	7.3
Percentage of men (15–59) circumcised				25	27
