= Waiswa =

Waiswa is a surname. Notable people with the surname include:

- Charles Waiswa (born 1987), Ugandan cricketer
- Kenneth Waiswa (born 1998), Ugandan cricketer
- Moses Waiswa (born 1997), Ugandan footballer
- Peter Kyobe Waiswa (born 1971), Ugandan researcher
- Sarah Waiswa, Ugandan photographer
