= Lydia Mungherera =

Ugandan Medical Doctor

Dr. Lydia Mungherera
- Citizenship: Uganda
- Education: Bachelor of Medicine, Bachelor of Surgery
- Alma mater: Makerere University, Gayaza High School, Nakasero Primary School
- Occupations: Doctor, Activist, Educactor
- Employer: Government of Uganda
- Mother: The Late Joyce Mungherera
- Relatives: The Late Margaret Mungherera (Sister)
- Awards: Red Ribbon Award 2008. Equality Award for Solidarity for Health 2015. HIHA awards Life Time Award category 2023.

Lydia Mungherera
- Education: Bachelor of Medicine, Bachelor of Surgery Makerere University
- Alma mater: Makerere University, Gayaza High School, Nakasero Primary School
- Occupation: Medical Doctor
- Notable work: HIV/AIDS activist, and Global Policy and Advocacy Officer.

Lydia Mungherera is a Ugandan medical doctor, educator, HIV/AIDS activist, and Global Policy and Advocacy Officer. She is the founder and CEO of Mamas Club Uganda, Co-Founder, The Global Athena Network, board member at Uganda AIDS Commission (UAC), and The International Community of Women Living With HIV. She works with TASO, the AIDS Support Organization in Uganda.

She was a Global Fund board member in 2020. She is in the struggle against HIV, TB and TB/HIV fight continually emphasizing to the world that women and girls are vulnerable should be given attention. She was elected President Uganda Medical Association in 2000 (first woman to hold that position) and later became President World Medical Association in 2013(first black to hold the position). She further supported the International Violence Against Women Act (IVAWA), a U.S policy that several dismissed as "cultural imperialism" . She founded the Pan African Treatment Access Movement and joined the International Community of Women Living with HIV (ICW), representing the network in UNAIDS and WHO in Geneva since 2003.

== Early life and education ==
Mungherera who has five siblings (Including the late Dr Margaret Mungherera) was born to the late Joyce Mungherera. She attended Nakasero Primary School and Gayaza High School for her secondary education and was admitted to Makerere University where she studied Medicine.

She was diagnosed with HIV in 1997 in South Africa where she had been working for about 8 years she was brought back to Uganda where she started on ARVs treatment and made a recovery and in 1998.

== Career ==
Mungherera qualified as a doctor in 1984, started working with communities in 1998. She worked as a Medical doctor in South Africa for about 8 years as a doctor. She joined TASO in 1999,was elected President Uganda Medical Association in 2000 and later became President World Medical Association in 2013 ,In 2004, she founded Mamas Club and is the Executive Director, Mamas Club Uganda and co-founded Uganda Cares in Masaka, to offer free anti-retroviral drugs to people living with HIV. She is also Co-Founder, The Global Athena Network.

Serves as a delegate on the Programme Coordinating Board (PCB) where she represents African NGOs on the UNAIDS board since 2003, Board member at Uganda AIDS Commission (UAC) and is on the Health Policy Advisory Committee (HPAC).

Member, The International Community of Women Living With HIV.

Member of the Doctors fraternity Uganda Medical Association(UMA).

Member of the Men Engage Gender Equality Network of Uganda, which is a platform for she uses to emphasize men's roles in sexual and reproductive health Rights.

== Awards and accomplishments ==
- Won the Red Ribbon Award at the 17th International AIDS Conference in Mexico City on 2008.
- Won Equality Award for Solidarity for Health under SMUG GALA AND EQUALITY AWARDS 2015.
- Winner HIHA awards, Life Time Award category, 2023.
- Finalist Africa Healthcare Awards 2024.

== Personal life ==
Mungherera has lived a life with HIV/AIDS, which killed her husband in 1992. She never re-married but has two children a son and daughter.

== See also ==
- Aggrey Kiyingi
- Geneva
