= Ekwaro Obuku =

Ugandan physician (born 1978)

- Born: 1978 (age 47–48); Victoria Hospital, Kisumu, Kenya
- Education: Makerere University; University of London; McMaster University
- Occupations: Health policy expert; clinical researcher; infectious diseases consultant; academic
- Years active: 2003–present
- Known for: Academics and Research
- Title: Immediate Past President of Uganda Medical Association

Ekwaro Obuku, is a Ugandan physician, researcher, academic and health policy expert, who is the immediate past president of the Uganda Medical Association, a professional industry association, that champions medical doctors' interests in the county. He is also currently, a Doctor of Philosophy candidate at Makerere University College of Health Sciences, in collaboration with McMaster University.

== Background and education ==
Obuku is the son of Teo Kibirige Obuku, a nurse and the late Dr. John Brian Obuku, a physician. His father hails from present-day Oyam District, while his mother is from southwestern Uganda. He was born in February 1978 at Victoria Hospital, in the city of Kisumu in Kenya at a time when the family had fled Idi Amin's regime in Uganda. Ekwaro is the third-born in a family of seven children.

Ekwaro attended nursery and primary schools in Kenya. In 1992, he returned to Uganda and was enrolled into St. Mary's College Kisubi, graduating in 1997 with a High School Diploma (A-Level Certificate). He entered Makerere University in 1998 on scholarship from the National Council of Sports, to study human medicine and play basketball. In 2003, he graduated from Makerere with a Bachelor of Medicine and Bachelor of Surgery. He quit playing professional basketball for the Falcon Guards due to the demands of studying for a medical degree.

In 2009, he graduated with a Master of Science in Clinical Trials, from the London School of Tropical Medicine, where he had studied on a scholarship awarded by the European and Developing Countries Clinical Trials Partnership. As of December 2019, he is pursuing a Doctor of Philosophy in Health Policy in a joint program between Makerere University College of Health Sciences, in Uganda and McMaster University in Canada.

== Career ==
Ekwaro interned at Arua Regional Referral Hospital. He continued to work there after his internship, in the paediatrics department, under the supervision of Christine Ondoa, a consultant paediatrician, who later served as Health Minister and then presidential adviser. He was then posted to Mungula Health Centre IV, in Adjumani District. He had to leave, a few months later due to insecurity, posed by the Lord's Resistance Army insurgency, which was raging at that time.

He relocated to Kampala and was hired by Dr Dickson Opulu, as a medical officer to work at the Uganda Workers’ Treatment Centre in Kampala and Jinja. While there, he became involved in the formulation of national and global HIV treatment policy for workers. He began collaboration with Makerere University and the Joint Clinical Research Centre, on HIV treatment and prevention. From 2010 until 2013, Obuku served at the Institute of Human Virology at the University of Maryland School of Medicine as a technical adviser on tuberculosis control.

== At Uganda Medical Association ==
In 2012, Obuku joined the Uganda Medical Association. The following year, he was elected as publicity and mobilisation secretary. He was later elected unopposed as secretary general. On 9 September 2017 at Hotel Africana, he was elected president for the next two years.

== Family ==
Ekwaro Obuku is a married father of seven children.

== Other considerations ==
Dr. Ekwaro Obuku teaches a course in Systematic Reviews as part of the MSc Clinical Trials long-distance program, at the London School of Tropical Medicine. He also teaches a course in Evidence Synthesis in the MSc in Clinical Epidemiology and Biostatistics at Makerere University, Uganda.

== See also ==
- Makerere University School of Medicine
- Mulago Hospital
