= Margaret Mungherera =

Ugandan physician

- Born: 25 October 1957; Jinja, Uganda
- Died: 4 February 2017 (aged 59); Chennai, India
- Education: Makerere University; London School of Hygiene and Tropical Medicine; Kampala International University; Gulu University
- Known for: President of the World Medical Association from 2013 to 2014
- Spouse: Richard Mushanga
- Scientific career
- Fields: Psychiatry; Health administration

Margaret Mungherera (25 October 1957 – 4 February 2017) was a senior consultant psychiatrist and medical administrator in Uganda. She served as the president of the Uganda Medical Association re-elected five times and ultimately the World Medical Association from October 2013 until October 2014. She advocated for psychiatric services throughout Uganda, beyond the capital, to improve conditions for Uganda's health-care providers and to get doctors organized in African countries in general.

== Early life and education ==
Margaret Mungherera was born in Jinja, Uganda. Her father, a retired civil servant, traced his roots to the Butaleja District in the Eastern Region of Uganda. She was one of five siblings, three of whom became medical doctors.

She attended Nakasero Primary School and Gayaza High School for her elementary and secondary education. In 1977, she was admitted to Makerere University to study human medicine. She graduated in 1982 with a Bachelor of Medicine and Bachelor of Surgery degree. After one year of internship at the Mulago National Referral Hospital, she attended the London School of Hygiene and Tropical Medicine, where she obtained a Diploma in Tropical Medicine and Hygiene in 1984. In 1992, she obtained a Master of Medicine in psychiatry from Makerere University. Her chosen field of concentration was forensic psychiatry.

== Career ==
From 1992 until 2000, she worked as a registrar at the Butabika National Referral Hospital, responsible for forensic services.

Concerned about the lack of counselling and support services for rape survivors in Uganda, Mungherera founded the non-governmental organisation Hope after Rape in 1994.

In 1999, she was elected President of the Uganda Medical Association (UMA) and was re-elected five more times. From 2000 until 2003, she was a consultant psychiatrist at the Mulago National Referral Hospital and was responsible for forensic services. Since 2003, she had served as a senior consultant psychiatrist at the Mulago Hospital Complex, responsible for psychiatric emergency services. Since 2012, she had been the clinical head of the Directorate of Medical Services (Departments of Internal Medicine and Psychiatry) at the Mulago National Referral Hospital.

From October 2013 until October 2014 she served as the first female president of the World Medical Association, elected as such by 50 national medical associations worldwide.

In September 2014, she was the keynote speaker at the Confederation of Medical Associations in Asia and Oceania General Assembly and 50th Council Meeting, Manila, the Philippines.

In June 2015, after 31 years of continuous service, Mungherera retired from civil service, aged 57 .

She died from colorectal cancer in Chennai, India, on 4 February 2017, at the age of 59.

== Honour ==
In November 2012, Mungherera received an Honorary Doctor of Philosophy from Kampala International University in recognition of her "historical achievements."

== Bibliography ==
=== Academic works ===
- Muhwezi, W.W.; Kinyanda, E.; Mungherera, M.; Onyango, P.; Ngabirano, E.; Muron, J.; Kagugube, J.; Kajungu, R. (2011). "Vulnerability to high risk sexual behaviour (HRSB) following exposure to war trauma as seen in post-conflict communities in eastern uganda: a qualitative study". Conflict and Health. 5: 22. doi:10.1186/1752-1505-5-22. PMC 3213062. PMID 22011647. Wikidata Q35541044.
- Kinyanda, E; Weiss, HA; Mungherera, M; Onyango-Mangen, P; Ngabirano, E; Kajungu, R; Kagugube, J; Muhwezi, W; Muron, J; Patel, V. (2016). "Intimate partner violence as seen in post-conflict eastern Uganda: prevalence, risk factors and mental health consequences". BMC International Health and Human Rights. 16: 5. doi:10.1186/s12914-016-0079-x. PMC 4733282. PMID 26825525. Wikidata Q35908710.
- Mungherera, M.; van der Straten, A.; Hall, T.L.; Faigeles, B.; Fowler, G.; Mandel, J.S. (1997). "HIV/AIDS-related attitudes and practices of hospital-based health workers in Kampala, Uganda". AIDS. 11 Suppl 1: S79-85. PMID 9376105. S2CID 7875072. Wikidata Q38887644.
- Kinyanda, E.; Weiss, H.A.; Mungherera, M.; Onyango-Mangen, P.; Ngabirano, E.; Kajungu, R.; Kagugube, J.; Muhwezi, W.; Muron, J.; Patel, V. (2012). "Psychiatric disorders and psychosocial correlates of high HIV risk sexual behaviour in war-affected Eastern Uganda". AIDS Care. 24 (11): 1323–1332. doi:10.1080/09540121.2011.647676. PMC 4991752. PMID 22272693. Wikidata Q37190981.
- Kinyanda, E; Weiss, HA; Mungherera, M; Onyango-Mangen, P; Ngabirano, E; Kajungu, R; Kagugube, J; Muhwezi, W; Muron, J; Patel, V. (2013). "Prevalence and risk factors of attempted suicide in adult war-affected population of eastern Uganda". Crisis. 34 (5): 314–323. doi:10.1027/0227-5910/a000196. PMID 23608229. Wikidata Q38865532.
- Krishnan, P.; Mungherera, M.; Jones, S.B. (2003). "Tobacco and the Commonwealth: a call to action". The Lancet. 361 (9370): 1669–1670. doi:10.1016/s0140-6736(03)13381-8. PMID 12767730. Wikidata Q40586260.
- M., Mungherera (2014). "The African health systems and the information society". JMA Journal. 57 (4): 175–177. PMC 4375251. PMID 26005604. Wikidata Q42687410.

== See also ==
- Uganda Ministry of Health
