= Peter Kyobe Waiswa =

Ugandan researcher, doctor, academic administrator (born 1971)

Professor Peter Kyobe Waiswa
- Born: Peter Kyobe Waiswa; 29 August 1971 (age 55); Uganda
- Education: Mbarara University (Bachelor of Medicine in Medicine and Surgery); Hebrew University of Jerusalem (Master of Public Health in public health) (Joint PhD in Medicine); Makerere University; Karolinska Institute (post-doctoral fellowship)
- Occupations: Researcher, medical doctor, and academic
- Years active: 1998–present
- Title: Associate professor of Health Policy, Planning and Management, School of Public Health, College of Health Sciences at Makerere University

Peter Kyobe Waiswa (born 29 August 1971) is a Ugandan researcher, medical doctor and academic administrator. He is an associate professor of Health Policy, Planning and Management at Makerere University. Waiswa is a health policy and health systems expert, with a special interest in maternal, newborn and child health in low and middle-income countries. He is the chairperson of the board of directors for Busoga Health Forum (BHF).

== Early life and education ==
Waiswa was born a twin on 29 August 1971 to the late Kyobe Kasiko Isabirye and Gladys Kasiko Nabirye of Naigobya village, Bukooma sub-county in Luuka District.

He attended Iganga Town Council Primary School, then went to Budini Secondary School for O'level and Jinja College for A'level. In 1992 he was enrolled at Mbarara University, Uganda graduating with a Bachelor of Medicine and surgery. His Masters degree in public health from Hebrew University of Jerusalem Braun School of Public Health and Community Medicine. His joint PhD in Medicine and postdoctoral fellowship were earned from Makerere University and Karolinska Institute, in Sweden.

Waiswa is a visiting researcher at the Karolinska Institute, Sweden.

== Career ==
Waiswa did his medical internship at Rubaga Missionary hospital in Kampala (1997–98), after which he worked as National First Aid Officer of the Uganda Red Cross (1999–2000), then as a doctor and assistant district medical officer for Iganga District. He was hired by Makerere University, serving in the Department of Health Policy, Planning and Management for the School of Public Health, College Of Health Sciences since 2008.

He is a founder and member of an NGO Uganda Development and Health Associates (UDHA) and One Village At A Time (OVAAT). He also founded and leads the research groups of the INDEPTH Network Maternal, Newborn & Child Health Working Group (MNCH-WG) and the Makerere University Centre of Excellence for Maternal Newborn & Child Health. He is also a member of the Uganda National Immunisation Technical Advisory Group. He regularly participates as a technical advisor for various local, national, regional and international organisations including WHO, UNICEF, the Bill & Melinda Gates Foundation, International Pediatric Association, African Academy of Sciences and XRP Healthcare.
