= Busoga Health Forum =

Ugandan based not-for-profit organisation

- Abbreviation: BHF
- Founded at: Busoga
- Type: NGO, Nonprofit
- Headquarters: Jinja District
- Region served: Busoga sub-region
- Services: Research and evaluation Health systems strengthening Lobbying Continuing Medical Education Services (CMES)
- Website: www.busogahealthforum.org

Busoga Health Forum (BHF) is a Uganda-based non-for-profit, non-governmental, and lobbying organisation that is based in Busoga region. It was established in 2020 to respond to health issues that are faced by women, children, and young people in Busoga region of Uganda. It is also known as the association of health workers in Busoga. It is an accredited Continuing Professional Development (CPD) points provider by the Uganda Medical and Dental Practitioners Council.

== Background ==
Busoga Health Forum was established in 2020 to respond to health issues that are faced by women, children, and young people to promote healthier families and communities in Busoga through a combination of research and evaluation, health systems strengthening, quality improvement and lobbying among other ways. It also promotes Continuing Medical Education Services (CMES).

Busoga Health Forum unites and empowers medical practitioners and researchers who are willing to serve the Busoga Community.

=== Membership ===
Busoga Health Forum membership is a voluntary based paid membership that is open to all interested parties and it exists in three categories that is; individuals, institutions and life membership.

=== Activities ===
Busoga Health Forum participates in research related activities, community based trainings, lobbying activities. BHF focuses on programs that include; Reproductive Health and Family planning, Nutrition and Early Child Development, Regional Planning and Data Use, Non-Communicable Diseases and Urban health.

== Partnerships ==
Busoga Health Forum's partners include; USAID, Program for Appropriate Technology in Health (PATH), Japan International Cooperation Agency (JICA), The Swedish International Centre for Local Democracy (ICLD), Busoga Kingdom, University of Michigan among other partners.

- The Swedish International Centre for Local Democracy supports children oriented projects that aim at improving the quality of children both in terms of medical management and patient involvement and satisfaction of care. These projects with Busoga Health Forum include; Neonates, children in need of emergency/critical care, children with neuropediatric conditions, and Child rights.
- Busoga Health Forum partners with Busoga Kingdom to organise health camps with in the Kingdom.

== Research and publications ==
- "Child health and the implementation of Community and District-management Empowerment for Scale-up (CODES) in Uganda: a randomised controlled trial".
- "Factors associated with compliance with Infection Prevention and Control measures during the COVID-19 pandemic among healthcare workers in Kampala City, Uganda".
- "Institutionalizing a regional model for improving quality of newborn care at birth across hospitals in Eastern Uganda: A 4-year story".
- "Impact of Solar Light and Electricity on the Quality and Timeliness of Maternity Care: A Stepped-Wedge Cluster-Randomized Trial in Uganda".
- "Study protocol for a type-II hybrid effectiveness-implementation trial to reach teenagers using mobile money shops to reduce unintended pregnancies in Uganda".

== Controversies ==
=== Donating of a sickle cell screening machine for Jinja Regional Referral Hospital ===
During the third Annual general meeting for Busoga Health Forum that was held in 2024, a sickle cell diagnosing machine worth fifteen million Ugandan shillings was handed to the Dr. Afizi Kibuuka who was the serving deputy medical director of Jinja Regional Referral Hospital.

== See also ==
- World Economic Forum
- World Social Forum
- SCO Forum
- Uganda Medical and Dental Practitioners Council
