= Maternal Mortality and Morbidity Task Force =

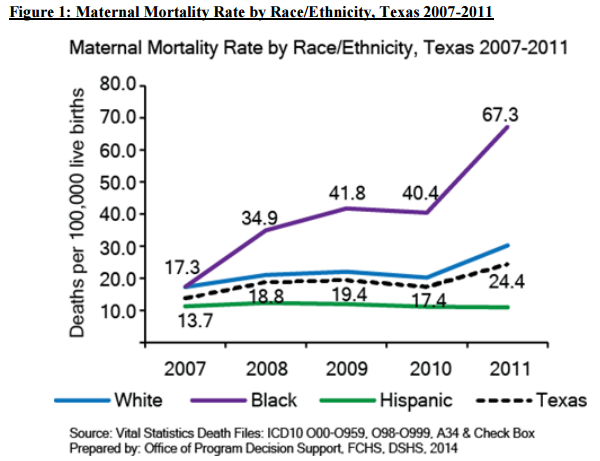
Maternal Mortality Rate by Race-Ethnicity, Texas 2007-2011

The Texas Maternal Mortality and Morbidity Task Force was started by the Department of State in 2013 to help reduce maternal death in Texas. The maternal mortality ratio (MMR) for the state of Texas was concluded to be the highest in the developed world in 2016, with the maternal mortality rate (MMRate) of the state surging beyond the already-poor US average (excluding California and Texas) MMRate of 23.8% to a remarkably high 35.8%.

The task force and DSHS must submit a joint report on the findings of the task force and recommendations to the governor, lieutenant governor, speaker of the House of Representatives, and appropriate committees of the Texas Legislature by September 1 of each even-numbered year, beginning September 1, 2016.

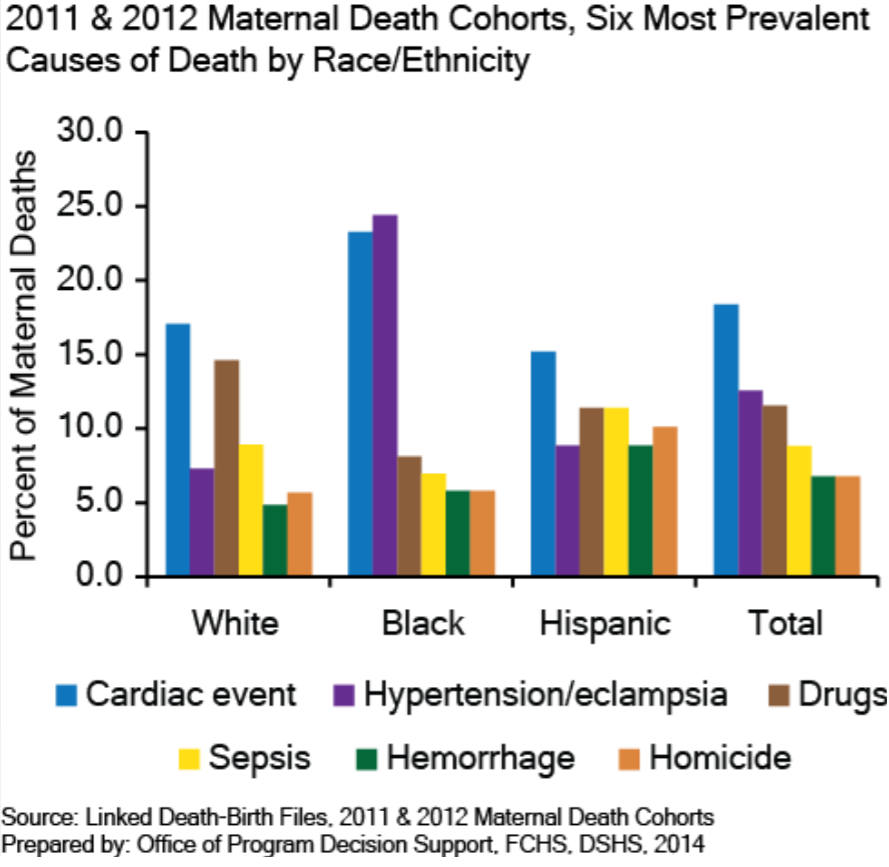
Texas 2011-2012 Maternal Death Cohorts - Six Most Prevalent Causes of Death by Race-Ethnicity

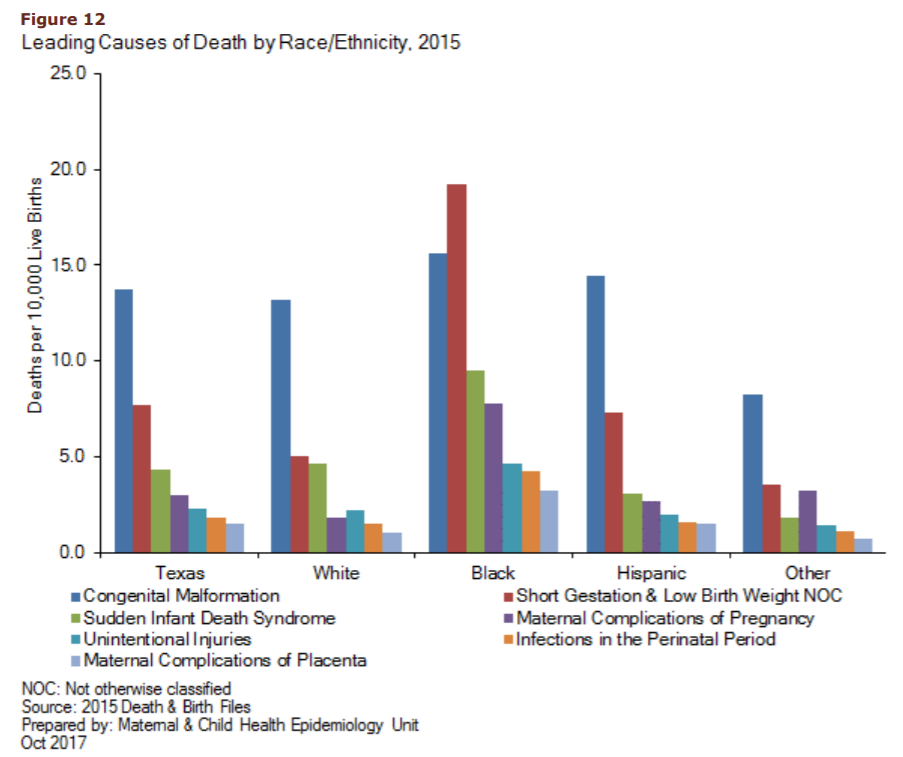
Texas 2017 report on leading causes of death among infants by Race-Ethnicity, Healthy Texas Babies Initiative

In the United States the maternal mortality ratio rose during the years 2002-2015. Although improvements in health care facilitated a dramatic decline in maternal mortality worldwide during the 20th century, women still die from complications of pregnancy, though there are significant differences in the top causes per region and income class. Since 1990 the World Health Organization measures both the maternal mortality ratio and the maternal mortality rate. In 1994 the period of measurement for a "maternal-related death" after childbirth was extended from six weeks to a year after the "birth event". The United States is one of the few developed countries for which both of the WHO measurements have gone up and not down. Nationally as well as in Texas, black women have a maternal mortality rate more than twice as high as White women and this disparity gap has increased since 2007, but the causes of this increase were unclear in 2013 and therefore the task force was formed to investigate. The estimated maternal mortality rate (per 100,000 live births) for 48 states and Washington, DC (excluding California and Texas) increased by 26.6%, from 18.8 in 2000 to 23.8 in 2014. California showed a declining trend, whereas Texas had a sudden increase in 2011-2012. The Texas rate had nearly doubled. Although reproductive health and maternal death is significantly different for black women, this is not part of the study conducted by the Boston Black Women's Health Study and the taskforce is the only known body studying this aspect. Since convening in 2013 the task force has produced two reports, in July 2014 and in September 2016.

In the latest report it shows a significantly higher increase in maternal mortality for black women. This may be related to a higher incidence of pre-pregnancy obesity, which has both been shown to be higher in black women and to be correlated to a first-time cesarean section. It may also be related to discrimination in health care for black women, which can take the form of reduced access to services and information.

== See also ==
- Maternal mortality in the United States
- Maternal healthcare in Texas
