= Matibabu (Rapid Malaria test) =

Rapid Malaria test

matibabu fights to close the gap between the communities and their rightful access to healthcare.

== Purpose and Use ==
In general, the lack of low cost diagnostics for malaria results in late diagnosis of the disease in many low income communities (contributing to high morbidity and mortality from severe forms of malaria), and over-treatment of malaria where syndromic management is used due to lack of point-of-care diagnostics (contributing to wastage of money on treatment of non-malarial illness especially since the new recommended Artemisinin-based therapies are expensive). Additionally, Inconsistent data relay to the Ministry of Health despite the fact that there are a number of data management platforms being used by health practitioners. The data received is inconsistent in terms of both quality and quantity and is often outdated or not in realtime. The current data collection and surveillance methods are through the national Health Management Information System (HMIS). Data is first collected at the health centre level where hard copies(paper/books) are used and electronic medical record systems for a few health centers that have the capacity. However there is very low usage of this system as paper-based records are lost in delivery, poor quality of data(inaccurate statistical data), untimely delivery of HMIS reports, exclusion of data from the private health providers and at the community level, inadequate segregation of HMIS data and limited political support. Lack of functional supply chains and adequate reporting around availability of supplies, means that often health facilities are without vital drugs and equipment for long periods of time and as a result drug and diagnostic performance can not be monitored.Efficient health information and data systems are vital for improved decision making and timely intervention. We are shifting into an era where data driven approaches have yielded appropriate resource utilization for implementing health programs.

The device is capable of detecting malaria parasites in red blood cells for diagnostic purposes. The device is being tested for use in hospitals, clinics and medical laboratories. The goal is to create Point-of-care-testing (POCT) opportunities in rural areas that lack healthcare access.

== Invention ==
The company offers an array of solutions as listed below;

1. Matiscope: The matiscope is a portable parasite-based hardware device that uses principles of light scattering and magnetism to detect Plasmodium in blood samples. The kit offers both invasive and non-invasive diagnosis with desktop point of care.
2. Yotta: captures data, such as location data and health survey information, anonymized data points in a securely managed central data store, and includes both automated and expert data analysis, and customized outputs and feedback that lead to timely and targeted responses. The data visualisation also enables us to run prediction algorithms on the data to deduce geographically customized disease trends.
3. Yotta cards: Patient tracking to support the health facilities manage & track medication issued, schedule routine visits & also patients saving on the card for health care access topped up with loans

Yotta surveillance apps: Powered with image recognition algorithms, the application is used at the health facility to collect the disease data in almost real time, with both offline and online capabilities.

The device was invented in Kampala, Uganda by Matibabu CEO Brian Gitta and his team (Joshua Businge, Josiah Kavuma, Moris Atwine, Simon Lubambo and Shafik Sekitto).

== Recognition ==
The team at matibabu, have realized Villgro Kenya, Bayer Foundation, e4impact, Merck Accelerator and the Resilient Africa Network(RAN) operating under The United States Agency for International Development.

matibabu has also been recognized on several occasions as the UN Empowerment Award through the Microsoft Imagine Cup, American Society for Mechanical Engineers' iShow, The Duke of York's Pitch@Palace, Royal Academy of Engineering The Aspirin Social Innovation Award, e4Impact, Disrupt 100, Time magazine Next Generation Leaders, 2019 Rolex Laureate and additionally, we have showcased at different platforms as the Consumer Electronics Show (CES), The Tech Open Air Festival, Republica, Global Sankalp forum, TechCrunch Hardware Battlefield. Brian Gitta was further invited to meet Bill Gates as part of the MTV Base Africa program in 2016.

== Advisors ==
Matibabu was part of the Merck Accelerator Program at the Merck Innovation Center in Darmstadt, Germany. The advisors of Matibabu include Dr. Nicole Kilian (Heidelberg University Hospital), Robert Karanja, MSc (Villgro Kenya) and Kush Mahan, MSc (ZoneIn).
