= Empower Through Health =

- Abbreviation: ETH
- Formation: 2018
- Type: Non-governmental organization (NGO)
- Legal status: 501(c)(3) nonprofit organization
- Headquarters: United States; operations in Jinja and Buyende District, Uganda
- Region served: Eastern Uganda
- Services: Health center, mental health, education, research
- Website: ethealth.org

Empower Through Health (ETH) is an American NGO operating in Eastern Uganda. ETH conducts global health research, operates a rural health center and is building a primary school in Buyende District. It is a registered 501(c)(3) nonprofit organization in the United States of America and a sister organization to Empowerment To Heal Uganda, registered as a NGO in Uganda.

== History ==
Founded in 2018 on the belief that all lives hold equal value, ETH seeks to address global disparities in healthcare by improving access to medical services in underserved regions of Uganda. The organization grew out of Yang Jae Lee's work in the Busoga region of Uganda beginning in 2015, including collaborations with Ugandan public health leaders and local partners on early health initiatives.

That same year, ETH opened the Mpunde Health Center in Buyende District, Uganda, which now serves over 10,000 people annually. The organization has also implemented public health education programs reaching approximately 70,000 community members.

In 2021, ETH expanded into education with the launch of the Global Health Experiential Fellowship (GHEF), a research training program for predoctoral students from Uganda and the United States. The program has trained over 160 alumni as of the end of 2024. ETH is also developing a primary school in Mpunde to invest in long-term community development.

== Projects ==
=== Healthcare ===
The health center is located in Mpunde, a village in Buyende District. According to Empower Through Health's website, the health center has treated 57,000 patients since it opened. It is registered with the Ugandan Ministry of Health. The facility provides free mental health care and primary medical services, including nutrition programs, deliveries, and community outreach campaigns such as immunization and deworming. In Uganda, mental health care is severely limited, and often only available in urban regions. For Buyende District, a catchment area of over 400,000 people, Mpunde Health Center is the referral center for mental healthcare.

=== Education ===
==== Global Health Experiential Fellowship ====
The Global Health Experiential Fellowship is a predoctoral training in global health research in which American and Ugandan students work together to conduct research in Eastern Uganda. GHEF is co-directed by researchers from Yale University and University of Washington and Ugandan public health practitioners. An evaluation of the program, published in SSM - Mental Health, reviewed the fellowship's outcomes and found that it strengthened cross-cultural collaboration and research capacity between Ugandan and American students.

==== Mpunde Education Initiative ====
Education in Buyende District faces significant challenges due to pervasive poverty, limited infrastructure, and low school completion rates, which constrain opportunities for children in rural areas. In response, ETH has initiated construction of a primary school in Mpunde to improve access to quality education in the area. The organization also continues providing support to vulnerable students in local primary and secondary schools by supplying learning materials and helping with tuition where feasible.

=== Research ===
ETH conducts research focused on improving access to physical and mental healthcare in low resource areas. The organization's research efforts have produced multiple peer-reviewed publications. ETH has published on community mental health, stigma reduction, and pathways to care in rural Uganda. Its work has included studies on beliefs about mental illness and suicidality, collaboration among traditional and biomedical providers, and pathways to care for psychosis. ETH has also explored anti-stigma interventions through community-led theater programs, the development of a radio program to destigmatize mental illness, and gender-specific stigma differences.

==== List of Research Publications ====
Journal	Title	Published
SSM - Mental Health	Mixed-methods evaluation of a Global South-North research fellowship in Uganda: Global health experiential fellowship (GHEF).	2025
BJPsych Open	Beliefs about the causes and treatment of common mental illnesses and suicidality in rural Uganda.	2025
Cambridge Prisms: Global Mental Health	Perspectives of traditional healers, faith healers, and biomedical providers about mental illness treatment: qualitative study from rural Uganda.	2025
Cambridge Prisms: Global Mental Health	Pathways to care for psychosis in rural Uganda: Mixed-methods study of individuals with psychosis, family members, and local leaders.	2024
Journal of Global Health Reports	Community perspectives to inform the development of a radio program to destigmatize mental illness in rural Uganda: a qualitative study.	2024
PLOS Mental Health	Differences in mental illness stigma by disorder and gender: Population-based vignette randomized experiment in rural Uganda.	2024
Current Psychology	Twelve-month outcomes of a destigmatizing theatrical intervention in rural Uganda.	2024
BMC Psychiatry	Evaluation of a pilot, community-led mental illness de-stigmatization theater intervention in rural Uganda.	2022
Emergency Medicine Journal	Exploring the factors motivating continued Lay First Responder participation in Uganda: a mixed-methods, 3-year follow-up.	2021
Heliyon	Survey on the prevalence of dyspepsia and practices of dyspepsia management in rural Eastern Uganda.	2019
Transactions of The Royal Society of Tropical Medicine and Hygiene	Treatment-seeking behavior and practices among caregivers of children aged≤ 5 y with presumed malaria in rural Uganda.	2019
World Journal of Surgery	Lay first responder training in eastern Uganda: leveraging transportation infrastructure to build an effective prehospital emergency care training program.	2018
