= Florence Muranga =

Ugandian biochemist, food scientist, academic and corporate executive

Professor Florence Muranga Isabirye
- Born: 1952 (age 73–74); Kabuli Village, Mayuge District, Uganda
- Citizenship: Uganda
- Education: Makerere University (Bachelor of Science) (Diploma Education) (Doctor of Philosophy in Biochemistry); University of Reading (Master of Science in Food Science),
- Occupations: Food Scientist, Academic and Corporate executive
- Years active: 1975 — present
- Known for: Academics, Scientific research
- Title: Executive Director of the Presidential Initiative on Banana Industrial Development (PIBID)
- Spouse: (Manuel Muranga)

Rev. Prof Florence Isabirye Muranga is a Ugandan biochemist, food scientist, academic and corporate executive, who serves as the Director General of "Banana Industrial |Research Development Centre (BIRDC)" under the pilot project of Presidential Initiative on Banana Industrial Development (PIBID), this project started in an effort to do research on value addition on green banana and later to boost the commercialization of Uganda's bananas through research and industrialization.

== Background and education ==
She was born in present-day Mayuge District circa 1952, and attended "Kabuli Primary School" for her elementary school education. For her secondary school studies, she attended Gayaza High School, a prestigious boarding girls' middle and high school, located in Gayaza, Wakiso District.

In 1975 she graduated from Makerere University, Uganda's largest and oldest public university, with a Bachelor of Science degree and a Diploma in Education. In 1990, she was awarded a Master of Science in Food Science by the University of Reading in the United Kingdom. Later in 2000, she graduated with a Doctor of Philosophy degree in Biochemistry, from Makerere University.

== Work experience ==
Before her retirement, Florence Isabirye Muranga was a Professor of Nutrition and Biochemistry in the Department of Food Technology and Nutrition at Makerere University. She has special interest in the nutritional value of the banana fruit, particularity the variety called matooke. She has published widely and extensively regarding her research on the subject.

== Banana research ==
In 2005 Professor Muranga had an encounter with the president of Uganda, Yoweri Museveni, and the president was impressed with the professor's research. Two years later, the president established the Presidential Initiative on Banana Industrial Development (PIBID) and named Muranaga the Executive Director. The program is an aggressive food-value addition effort, yielding a range of matooke byproducts including (a) tooke biscuits (cookies) (b) tooke powder for porridge (c) tooke flour for matooke meal and bread-making (d) matooke chips for snacking (e) matooke flakes for cereal and (f) matooke starch and others.

PIBID established a banana farm on a 24 acres (10 ha) piece of land and a modern matooke processing factory in the town of Bushenyi, in Bushenyi District in the Western Region of Uganda.

== Family ==
Florence Muranga is married to Manuel Muranga since 1978 and together they are the parents of two sons.

== Other considerations ==
In November 2016, the president of Uganda appointed a commission of inquiry into the affairs of Makerere University and named Professor Florence Muranga as one of its nine members. In 2006, the Management Forum of the British Council, based in London, United Kingdom, recognized Professor Muranga as one of the "Top Women in 2006". At home, she won the Presidential Scientific Innovation Excellence Award at the 2005/06 Presidential Science Awards in recognition of her pomneering work on the matooke fruit. Since about 2000, Florence Muranga has served as an Assistant Chaplain at Saint Francis Chapel, the principal Anglican church at Makerere University campus in Kampala, Uganda's capital and largest city.

== See also ==
- Makerere University
- Agriculture in Uganda
- Economy of Uganda
