= Just Like My Child Foundation =

Nonprofit organization

Just Like My Child Foundation (JLMC) is a San Diego–based 501(c)(3) organization that works with women and children in rural Uganda and Senegal. Its goal is to create healthy and self-sustaining families who prosper without further aid. Its holistic system encompasses health care, education, women's rights and economic development. The foundation subscribes to a philosophy called deep development focusing on one local area or cluster of villages while addressing critical issues simultaneously.

Vivian Glyck founded the Just Like My Child Foundation in 2006.

== Overview ==
The Just Like My Child Foundation is an organization that employs an outreach approach, using a strategy of alliances with existing indigenous organizations and facilities that have a respected and broad reach into large populations. To ensure sustainable change, the foundation works directly with leaders in the community to enhance leadership capacity and motivate citizens towards self-reliance and empowerment that will sustain the community into the future without further aid.

Just Like My Child Foundation subscribes to a philosophy the organization calls Deep Development, focusing on a specific local area or a cluster of rural villages while addressing critical issues simultaneously, such as disease, inadequate education, poor infrastructure, women's and girl's empowerment and lack of economic development. With the goal of encouraging microenterprises and education to further assist rural villages within the community and addressing issues of justice along with women and children empowerment.

Since 2006, JLMC and its first indigenous and primary healthcare partner, Bishop Caesar Asili Memorial Health Centre in Central Uganda serves 48 villages and 600,000 people, specifically in the rural, three-district region of Luwero, Nakaseke and Nakasongola. Just Like My Child has funded six schools in various Central Ugandan districts, such as Luwero and Nakaseke.

== History ==
Vivian Glyck founded the Just Like My Child Foundation in July 2006 after a trip to Africa in May 2006 where she met Sister Ernestine Akulu. Upon arriving home, she decided she wanted to help the women and children of East Africa. Glyck asked Sister Ernestine of the Bishop Asili Hospital in Luwero, Uganda how she could help. Sister Ernestine requested a generator for the hospital and a CD-4 count analyzer machine.

Since late 2006, Glyck raised $30,000 to acquire a generator for the Asili Hospital, which has ensured doctors continuous electricity, refrigeration for medicine, and stability for patients. She also secured assistance from the Clinton Foundation that made the CD-4 analyzer a reality for Asili Hospital, thus, HIV+ patients, especially pregnant mothers and children, have a much easier access to antiretroviral treatment.

Just Like My Child created a scholarship program in the village of Kikoirro, Uganda, to send a child named Nyangoma Rachel to one of the best boarding school in Uganda. In October 2009, JLMC's first school, The Children's Academy for the Collective Heart, opened with support from Debbie Ford's Collective Heart Foundation, Cynthia Kersey's Unstoppable Foundation, and the Mark Victor Hansen Foundation, and serves nearly 400 children.

== Programs ==
Just Like My Child supports through sustainable development – what they call "giving a hand up, never a hand out." JLMC supports a broad variety of international development solutions through projects focused specifically on assisting developing countries and is structured around the following six programs:

- Project "Keep A Mother Alive" – A project that has provided at risk mothers and newborns with prenatal care and education, community outreach, malaria prevention, infection control, and emergency obstetrical intervention which includes C-sections, ultrasound diagnosis, infrastructure for blood supply and AIDS treatment as well as a medical staff.
- Project "Universal Education" – A co-investment model that partners with the entire community creating public and private schools as well as raising funds for educational tools and staff. To date, JLMC has funded six primary schools.
- Project GRACE – A microenterprise program that provides a small loan (poultry or livestock) with intensive training to healthy, self-motivated individuals with HIV. Participants support and work with each other as well as encourage others to be tested for HIV at their local hospital, Bishop Asili.
- The Mandela Project – A program named after Nelson Mandela and sponsored through JLMC's Professional Development Fund. The program sponsors the continuing education of doctors, nurses, and professionals as well as sponsors primary and secondary school children who show true leadership. Funds come directly from Just Like My Child Foundation donors and sponsors. Recipients agree to share their knowledge with their community.
- Project Justice – A comprehensive human rights education program conducted in partnership with the Federation of Women Attorneys (FIDA]. Community members are empowered with knowledge of their rights.
- The "Girl Power" Project – A grass roots program designed for young Ugandan girls, which includes empowerment training, how to fend off sexual violence, and how to report perpetrators safely and without retribution.
