= Uganda Medical Association =

Coordinates: 00°19′09″N 32°34′33.5″E

- Abbreviation: UMA
- Formation: 1964; 62 years ago
- Type: Professional association
- Legal status: Nonprofit organization
- Purpose: Medicine in Uganda
- Headquarters: Kampala
- Region served: Uganda
- Members: ~1,500
- Official language: English
- President: Dr. Herbert Luswata
- Vice President: Dr. Frank Rubabinda Asiimwe
- Affiliations: World Medical Association
- Website: Homepage

The Uganda Medical Association (UMA), is a registered non-governmental, professional organization that brings together all the qualified and duly registered medical doctors in Uganda.

== Location ==
The association maintains its headquarters at Chrisams Designs Building, Kafeeero Road, Old Mulago. Kampala | P.O. Box 2243, Kampala, Uganda, in the central business district of Kampala, the capital and largest city of Uganda. The geographical coordinates of the headquarters of UMA are:Latitude: 0.344796; Longitude: 32.573614).

== Objectives ==
The Association focuses on advocating for doctors' welfare, continuous medical education and training, upholding medical ethics and patient safety, and strengthening public health systems through partnerships with government and NGOs

As an association for medical practitioners, this association also focuses on the following.

- To contribute to universal access to health and health care.
- To promote professional ethical standards among medical doctors in Uganda.
- To promote the welfare of medical doctors in Uganda.
- To mobilize doctors to join and encourage them to actively participate in the Association's activities.
- To strengthen the financial base of the Association.

== Overview ==
According to the Association's website, UMA has five focus areas: (1) to "contribute to universal access to health and health care" (2) to "promote professional ethical standards among medical doctors in Uganda" (3) to "promote the welfare of medical doctors in Uganda" (4) to mobilize doctors to join and encourage them to actively participate in the Association’s activities and (5) to strengthen the financial base of the Association.

== History ==
The Uganda Medical Association was founded in 1964 and functioned, in the beginning, as a branch of the British Medical Association.

== Governance ==
The policies of the Association are set by the National Governing Council (NGC), a 55-member group, representing all medical and surgical sub-specialties and doctor groups, including medical and surgical interns, senior house officers and retired doctors.

== Management ==
The Association is managed by a nine-member Executive Committee (EC), elected for two-year terms. The 2021-2023 EC was led by the President of the Association, Samuel Oledo, deputized by Dr. Edith Nakku .

Dr. Herbert Luswata has been elected as the new president of the Uganda Medical Association (UMA), with Prof. Frank Asiimwe chosen as the vice president. The election, which took place on November 11, saw Dr. Luswata secure 57% of the votes, while his opponent, Dr. Othiniel Musana, received 47%, according to UMA records.

Dr. Oledo faced impeachment following allegations that he made a political statement by orchestrating a demonstration where individuals in clinical attire knelt before President Museveni, endorsing him for the 2026 presidential candidacy. Before this incident, Dr. Oledo had led doctors in strikes advocating for improved welfare and salaries for health workers. Under his leadership, the government took steps to enhance salaries for scientists and health workers.

== See also ==
- Uganda Dental Association
- Uganda Medical and Dental Practitioners Council
- World Medical Association
