= Uganda Dental Association =

- Abbreviation: UDA
- Formation: 1960s
- Type: Professional association
- Legal status: [Nonprofit organization]
- Purpose: Dentistry in Uganda
- Headquarters: Kampala, Uganda
- Region served: Uganda - Eastern Africa - EAC
- Members: 280
- Official language: English
- President: Dr. Geoffrey Bataringaya
- Affiliations: FDI World Dental Federation
- Website: www.ugadent.org

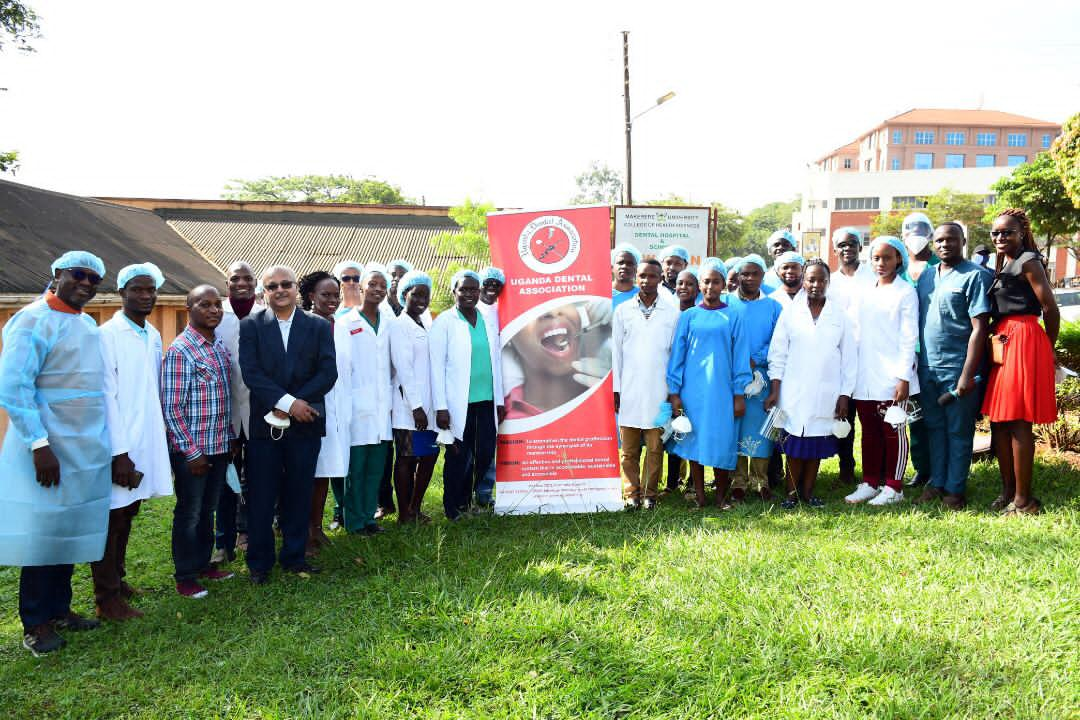
Uganda Dental health Association camp

The Uganda Dental Association (UDA) is a registered non-governmental organization that brings together all the qualified dental surgeons retired or practicing in Uganda. Headquartered in Uganda's capital city Kampala, the UDA serves its members and the public by managing key oral health issues on their behalf and by coordinating dental health awareness programs across the nation.

The core objective of the UDA is to promote advancement of dentistry through the exchange of ideas amongst dental surgeons, in Uganda and the world. The association uses its leadership role to ensure that the rights and privileges of the members are enjoyed by all and acts as a watchdog to regulate the dental profession in Uganda. The association also ensures that the expectations of the public are met and is actively involved with lobbying and advocacy initiatives.

The UDA publishes an annual journal of dental related articles called UDA Journal. Every November, the UDA fraternity marks Dental Health Week with media campaigns, screening and treatment for dental diseases and dental health education through outreach to the underserved communities. On 20 March each year, the UDA joins the world in observing World Oral Health Day (WOHD) by organizing special awareness campaigns and clinics.

== History ==
The UDA was founded in the 1960s by five dentists, namely; Dr.Jack Barlow, Dr. Bisase Arnold, Dr.Aliker Okello, Dr. Amooti Rwamirimo Nkurukenda and Dr. William B. Nganwa. In the 1970s during President Idi Amin's regime, the association became inactive after the murder of Dr.Jack Barlow by president Amin. It was later revived in the 1980s by Dr. George W. Ssamula together with Dr. William B. Nganwa and Dr. J. F. Tiromwe. As of 2014, the UDA has more than 280 members. In 2010 the UDA published the first UDA Journal. The first UDA office was at Mulago Hospital. The current UDA headquarters were opened at the Department of Dentistry Makerere University, in 2013.

== Function ==
The organisation provides continued dental education to its members through workshops, monthly UDA Meetings and UDA journals. The UDA provides a platform for dentists to network nationally and internationally. The organisation helps dentists to engage in outreach programmes and events which benefit both the community and the member. The UDA provides additional credibility to dental practitioners Uganda.

Also, the dental association provides group discounts on professional fees paid by its members; for example Group Professional Indemnity. Finally, the association lends books and DVDs to its members.

=== Regulation of dentists ===
The UDA acts as a watchdog to regulate the dental profession in Uganda in collaboration with the Uganda Medical & Dental Practitioners Council (UMDPC) which is mandated by Uganda’s Ministry of Health to regulate professional Medical Officers and Dental Surgeons in the country. The UDA has a representative on the UMDPC Board as per the Medical and Dental Practitioners Act 1998.

== Membership ==
The association consists of Dental Surgeons, Honorary Members and Associate members qualified and/or with a professional connection with dentistry in Uganda. Qualified dentists must be registered with the Association, and thereafter with the Uganda Medical and Dental Practitioners Council upon payment of the levied charges and Professionals other than dentists whose work is related to dentistry may apply for membership of the association.

The UDA is a member of various international bodies like FDI and the Commonwealth Dental Association (CDA).

The association has a partnership with Wrigleys. The UDA is promoting good oral hygiene and practice in communities around Uganda through The Wrigley Oral Healthcare Program. Colgate and GlaxoSmithKline (GSK) usually sponsor the UDA’s countrywide initiatives.

== Publications ==
The UDA produces regular dental publications, such as the UDA Journal. In April 2021, the UDA published their World Oral health Day report for activities they performed on March 20, 2021. Past editions of the journal and the WOHD report are available for download on their website, www.ugadent.org.

== See also ==
- Uganda Medical and Dentists Association
- Uganda Medical & Dental Practitioners Council
- FDI World Dental Federation
