= Uganda Medical and Dental Practitioners Council =

Organization

Coordinates: 00°19′58″N 32°34′40″E

- Abbreviation: UMDPC
- Formation: 1913
- Type: Quasi-Government Professional Organization
- Purpose: Regulate, Monitor and Supervise Medical and Dental Practice In Uganda
- Location: Kampala, Uganda
- Region served: Republic of Uganda
- Official language: English
- Registrar: Dr. Katumba Ssentongo Gubala
- Website: Homepage

Uganda Medical and Dental Practitioners Council is a quasi-government professional organisation in Uganda, established by an Act of Parliament, responsible for licensing, monitoring and regulating the practice of medicine and dentistry in the country. The organization's mandate includes the regulation of both the practitioners and the facilities from where they practice their professions.

== Location ==
The council is located at Block 5, Plot number 442 Kafeero Zone road - Mulago, in Kampala, the capital of Uganda, and the largest city in that East African country. The coordinates of the offices are 0°19'58.0"N, 32°34'40.0"E (Latitude:0.332778; Longitude:32.577778).

== History ==
The Uganda Medical and Practitioners Council was established in 1913. The laws governing its mandate and functions have been revised from time to time, as the practice of medicine and dentistry has advanced. The current parliamentary act that governs the council was promulgated in 1996. It is known as the "Uganda Medical and Dental Practitioners Act 11, of 1996".

== Overview ==
The council is mandated by the Uganda Ministry of Health to carry out the following functions:

- To develop and maintain accurate registers of all physicians and surgeons in Uganda.
- To develop and maintain accurate registers of all dental surgeons and dentists in Uganda.
- To ensure that what is taught in Ugandan medical and dental schools meets Internationally accepted standards and practices.
- To register and monitor all medical and dental practices, both public and private, ensuring that they meet the expected standards of quality and ethical professional practice. The Council is expected to take remedial action when these standards are breached, including closing the facility or facilities down, temporarily or permanently, if deemed necessary.
- To monitor the way physicians, surgeons, dentists and dental surgeons practice their craft. The Council is authorized to discipline practitioners who breach the established standard of care, including suspension or revocation of the practitioner's license.
- To advise government on the practice of medicine and dentistry in the country.
- To advise and educate the public on medical and dental matters and to matters related to medical ethics.

== See also ==
- UG Health Ministry
- UG Medical Schools
- UG Medical Education
