= Maternal mortality ratio =

KPI measurement of maternal death

Maternal mortality

The maternal mortality ratio (MMR) is the annual number of female deaths per 100,000 live births from any cause related to or aggravated by pregnancy or its management (excluding accidental or incidental causes). It is not to be confused with the maternal death rate, which is the number of maternal deaths (direct and indirect) in a given period per 100,000 women of reproductive age during the same time period. MMR is a key performance indicator (KPI) for efforts to improve the health and safety of mothers before, during, and after childbirth per country worldwide. The statistics are gathered by WHO, UNICEF, UNFPA, World Bank Group, and the United Nations Population Division. The yearly report started in 1990 and is called Trends in Maternal Mortality. As of the 2015 data published in 2016, the countries that have seen an increase in the maternal mortality ratio since 1990 are the Bahamas, Georgia, Guyana, Jamaica, Dem. People’s Rep. Korea, Serbia, South Africa, St. Lucia, Suriname, Tonga, United States, Venezuela, RB Zimbabwe. But according to Sustainable Development Goals report 2018, the overall maternal mortality ratio has declined by 37 percent since 2002. Nearly 303,000 women died due to complications during pregnancy.

With an exceptionally high mortality ratio compared to other U.S. states, the government of Texas created the Maternal Mortality and Morbidity Task Force in 2013.

== Country measurements ==
This KPI was used for the Millennium Development Goals from 2000 to 2015 and is part of the Sustainable Development Goals. The list of countries with a comparison of this KPI in 1990, 2000 and 2015 are:

Country	1990	2000	2015
Afghanistan	1,340	1,100	396
Albania	71	43	29
Algeria	216	170	140
American Samoa			
Andorra			
Angola	1,160	924	477
Antigua and Barbuda			
Argentina	72	60	52
Armenia	58	40	25
Aruba			
Australia	8	9	6
Austria	8	5	4
Azerbaijan	64	48	25
Bahamas, The	46	61	80
Bahrain	26	21	15
Bangladesh	569	399	176
Barbados	58	48	27
Belarus	33	26	4
Belgium	9	9	7
Belize	54	53	28
Benin	576	572	405
Bermuda			
Bhutan	945	423	148
Bolivia	425	334	206
Bosnia and Herzegovina	28	17	11
Botswana	243	311	129
Brazil	104	66	44
British Virgin Islands			
Brunei Darussalam	35	31	23
Bulgaria	25	21	11
Burkina Faso	727	547	371
Burundi	1,220	954	712
Cabo Verde	256	83	42
Cambodia	1,020	484	161
Cameroon	728	750	596
Canada	7	9	7
Cayman Islands			
Central African Republic	1,290	1,200	882
Chad	1,450	1,370	856
Channel Islands			
Chile	57	31	22
China	97	58	27
Colombia	118	97	64
Comoros	635	499	335
Congo, Dem. Rep.	879	874	693
Congo, Rep.	603	653	442
Costa Rica	43	38	25
Côte d'Ivoire	745	671	645
Croatia	10	11	8
Cuba	58	43	39
Curaçao			
Cyprus	16	15	7
Czech Republic	14	7	4
Denmark	11	9	6
Djibouti	517	401	229
Dominica			
Dominican Republic	198	79	92
Ecuador	185	103	64
Egypt, Arab Rep.	106	63	33
El Salvador	157	84	54
Equatorial Guinea	1,310	702	342
Eritrea	1,590	733	501
Estonia	42	26	9
Ethiopia	1,250	897	353
Faroe Islands			
Fiji	63	42	30
Finland	6	5	3
France	13	12	8
French Polynesia			
Gabon	422	405	291
Gambia, The	1,030	887	706
Georgia	34	37	36
Germany	11	8	6
Ghana	634	467	319
Gibraltar			
Greece	5	4	3
Greenland			
Grenada	41	29	27
Guam			
Guatemala	205	178	88
Guinea	1,040	976	679
Guinea-Bissau	907	800	549
Guyana	171	210	229
Haiti	625	505	359
Honduras	272	133	129
Hong Kong SAR, China			
Hungary	24	15	17
Iceland	7	5	3
India	556	374	174
Indonesia	446	265	126
Iran, Islamic Rep.	123	51	25
Iraq	107	63	50
Ireland	11	9	8
Isle of Man			
Israel	11	8	5
Italy	8	5	4
Jamaica	79	89	89
Japan	14	10	5
Jordan	110	77	58
Kazakhstan	78	65	12
Kenya	687	759	510
Kiribati	234	166	90
Korea, Dem. People’s Rep.	75	128	82
Korea, Rep.	21	16	11
Kosovo			
Kuwait	7	7	4
Kyrgyz Republic	80	74	76
Lao PDR	905	546	197
Latvia	48	30	18
Lebanon	74	42	15
Lesotho	629	649	487
Liberia	1,500	1,270	725
Libya	39	17	9
Liechtenstein			
Lithuania	29	16	10
Luxembourg	12	13	10
Macao SAR, China			
Macedonia	14	12	8
Madagascar	778	536	353
Malawi	957	890	634
Malaysia	79	58	40
Maldives	677	163	68
Mali	1,010	834	587
Malta	13	15	9
Marshall Islands			
Mauritania	859	813	602
Mauritius	81	40	53
Mexico	90	77	38
Micronesia, Fed. Sts.	183	153	100
Moldova	51	49	23
Monaco			
Mongolia	186	161	44
Montenegro	10	11	7
Morocco	317	221	121
Mozambique	1,390	915	489
Myanmar	453	308	178
Namibia	338	352	265
Nauru			
Nepal	901	548	258
Netherlands	12	14	7
New Caledonia			
New Zealand	18	12	11
Nicaragua	173	202	150
Niger	873	794	553
Nigeria	1,350	1,170	814
Northern Mariana Islands			
Norway	7	7	5
Oman	30	20	17
Pakistan	431	306	178
Palau			
Panama	102	82	94
Papua New Guinea	470	342	215
Paraguay	150	158	132
Peru	251	140	68
Philippines	152	124	114
Poland	17	8	3
Portugal	17	13	10
Puerto Rico	26	22	14
Qatar	29	24	13
Romania	124	51	31
Russian Federation	63	57	25
Rwanda	1,300	1,020	290
Samoa	156	93	51
San Marino			
São Tomé and Príncipe	330	222	156
Saudi Arabia	46	23	12
Senegal	540	488	315
Serbia	14	17	17
Seychelles			
Sierra Leone	2,630	2,650	1,360
Singapore	12	18	10
Sint Maarten (Dutch part)			
Slovak Republic	11	8	6
Slovenia	12	12	9
Solomon Islands	364	214	114
Somalia	1,210	1,080	732
South Africa	108	85	138
South Sudan	1,730	1,310	789
Spain	6	5	5
Sri Lanka	75	57	30
St. Kitts and Nevis	44	145	7
St. Lucia	45	54	48
St. Martin (French part)			
St. Vincent and the Grenadines	58	74	45
Sudan	744	544	311
Suriname	127	259	155
Swaziland	635	586	389
Sweden	8	5	4
Switzerland	8	7	5
Syrian Arab Republic	123	73	68
Tajikistan	107	68	32
Tanzania	997	842	398
Thailand	40	25	20
Timor-Leste	1,080	694	215
Togo	568	491	368
Tonga	75	97	124
Trinidad and Tobago	90	62	63
Tunisia	131	84	62
Turkey	97	79	16
Turkmenistan	82	59	42
Turks and Caicos Islands			
Tuvalu			
Uganda	687	620	343
Ukraine	46	34	24
United Arab Emirates	17	8	6
United Kingdom	10	12	9
United States	12	12	28
Uruguay	37	31	15
Uzbekistan	54	34	36
Vanuatu	225	144	78
Venezuela, RB	94	90	95
Vietnam	139	81	54
Virgin Islands (U.S.)			
West Bank and Gaza	118	72	45
Yemen, Rep.	547	440	385
Zambia	577	541	224
Zimbabwe	440	590	443

== List of aggregated data by region ==
Region	1990	2015
World	385	216
Arab World	289	156
Caribbean small states	94	99
Central Europe and the Baltics	41	11
East Asia & Pacific	159	59
Euro area	11	6
Europe & Central Asia	44	16
European Union	18	8

== List of aggregated data by focus subject ==
Focus subject	1990	2015
Fragile and conflict affected situations	792	481
Heavily indebted poor countries (HIPC)	957	482
Latin America & Caribbean	135	67
Least developed countries: UN classification	903	436
Middle East & North Africa	166	81
North America	11	13
OECD members	32	14
Other small states	538	316
Pacific island small states	176	75
Small states	428	272
South Asia	558	182
Sub-Saharan Africa	987	547
High income	15	10
Low & middle income	425	237
Low income	1,010	496
Lower middle income	533	251
Middle income	349	180
Upper middle income	114	54

== See also ==
- List of countries by infant and under-five mortality rates
- List of countries by maternal mortality ratio
- List of countries by death rate
- Maternal mortality
