= HIV/AIDS in Uganda =

The very high rate of human immunodeficiency virus (HIV) infection experienced in Uganda during the 1980s and early 1990s created an urgent need for people to know their HIV status. The only option available to them was offered by the National Blood Transfusion Service, which carries out routine HIV tests on all the blood that is donated for transfusion purposes. The great need for testing and counseling resulted in a group of local non-governmental organizations such as The AIDS Support Organisation, Uganda Red Cross, Nsambya Home Care, the National Blood Bank, the Uganda Virus Research Institute together with the Ministry of Health establishing the AIDS Information Centre in 1990. This organisation worked to provide HIV testing and counseling services with the knowledge and consent of the client involved.

In Uganda, HIV/AIDS has been approached as more than a health issue and in 1992 a Multi-sectoral AIDS Control Approach was adopted. In addition, the Uganda AIDS Commission, also founded in 1992, has helped develop a national HIV/AIDS policy. A variety of approaches to AIDS education have been employed, ranging from the promotion of condom use to 'abstinence only' programmes.

To further Uganda's efforts in establishing a comprehensive HIV/AIDS programme, in 2000 the Ugandan Ministry of Health implemented birth practices and safe infant feeding counseling. According to the WHO, around 41,000 women received Preventing Mother To child Transmission (PMTCT) services in 2001. Uganda was the first country to open a Voluntary Counseling and Testing (VCT) clinic in Africa called AIDS Information Centre and pioneered the concept of voluntary HIV testing centers in Sub-Saharan Africa.

The Ugandan government, through President Yoweri Museveni, has promoted this as a success story in the fight against HIV and AIDS, arguing it has been the most effective national response to the pandemic in sub-Saharan Africa. Though equally there has in recent years been growing criticism that these claims are exaggerated, and that the HIV infection rate in Uganda is on the rise.

There are striking similarities with the history of HIV/AIDS response in Senegal, where an equally high-level political response was encouraged by the fact that the HIV-2 strain of the disease was discovered by the Senegalese scientist Dr. Mboup.

Uganda has experienced the sharpest decrease in HIV/AIDS-related death rate in the world between 1990 and 2017, with an 88 percent decrease a timespan of twenty seven years. Other awareness programmes are arranged annually nationwide by the Uganda Network of AIDs Support Organisations to provide HIV Training, the exercises involve community members, health workers, musicians, partners and community activists such as Canadian Lanie Banks who led musician participants in the 2023 HIV Training awareness campaign. These trainings are aimed at equipping Ugandans with HIV, TB and AIDs knowledge.

== History ==
Some residents in southern Uganda believe that Tanzanian soldiers introduced HIV/AIDS into the region during the 1979 Uganda–Tanzania War, spreading the disease by having sex with civilians.

An overarching policy known as "ABC", which consisted of abstinence, monogamy (be faithful), and condoms, was set up with the aim of helping to curb the spread of AIDS in Uganda, where HIV infections reached epidemic proportions in the 1980s. The prevalence of HIV began to decline in the late 1980s and continued to decline throughout the 1990s. Between 1991 and 2007, HIV prevalence rates declined dramatically. Various claims have been made on the extent of these declines, but mathematical models estimated falls from about 15 percent in 1991 to about 6 percent in 2007.

Shortly after he came into office in 1986, President Museveni spearheaded a mass education campaign promoting a three-pronged AIDS prevention message: abstinence from sexual activity until marriage; monogamy within marriage; and condoms as a last resort. The message became commonly known as ABC: Abstinence, be faithful, use a condom if A and B fail. This message also addressed the high rates of concurrency in Uganda, which refers to the widespread cultural practice of maintaining two or more sexual partners at a time. Mass media campaigns also targeting this practice including the "Zero-Grazing" and "Love Carefully" public health messages in the 1990s.

The government used a multi-sector approach to spread its AIDS prevention message: it developed strong relationships with government, community and religious leaders who worked with the grassroots to teach ABC. Schools incorporated the ABC message into curricula, while faith-based communities trained leaders and community workers in ABC. The government also launched an aggressive media campaign using print, billboards, radio, and television to promote abstinence, monogamy, and condom use.

Condoms were not the main element of the AIDS prevention message in the early years. President Museveni said, "We are being told that only a thin piece of rubber stands between us and the death of our Continent ... they (condoms) cannot become the main means of stemming the tide of AIDS." He emphasised that condoms should be used, "if you cannot manage A and B ... as a fallback position, as a means of last resort."

Some reports suggest that the decline in AIDS prevalence in Uganda was due to monogamy and abstinence, rather than condom use. According to Edward C. Green, a medical anthropologist at the Harvard School of Public Health, the promotion of fidelity to one's partner and abstinence were the most important factors in Uganda's success because they disrupted the widespread practice of having multiple concurrent sexual partners. Research found that in rural Uganda, the educational messaging regarding condom use was often not effective. In fact, it was found that twenty-three percent of adolescents surveyed did not even know about condoms. A 2004 study published in the journal Science also concluded that abstinence among young people and monogamy, rather than condom use, contributed to the decline of AIDS in Uganda.

However, a field-study conducted in Rakai, a region in southern Uganda, showed that abstinence and fidelity rates had been declining during 1995–2002, but without the expected rise in HIV/AIDS rates, suggesting a greater role for condoms than acknowledged by Museveni. The other central finding of the Rakai study was that, due to Uganda's focus on prevention of the spread of HIV-AIDS, rather than treatment for those who had already contracted the disease, a large part of the decline in prevalence of HIV-AIDS is due to the premature death of those who have contracted it. This led to the popular play on the ABC campaign, 'A-B-C-D', with the D standing for Death. Because only prevalence is measured, incidence can actually increase while prevalence decreases if those who contract HIV are not treated for the disease, thereby dying younger. Later studies have seriously questioned the veracity of Uganda's HIV-AIDS claims..

In the 1990s there had been limited access to treatment in the form of anti-retrovirals for those who are HIV positive. As access to anti-retrovirals increased in Uganda, however, studies began to investigate the conflicting social influences on a woman's desire to continue having children. It was found that while some women felt socially obliged to continue reproducing in order to have a respectable number of offspring, others felt societal taboo and pressure as parents with HIV were thought to be bearing orphans. the combined effort of US PEPFAR, the government of Uganda, and international agencies (Clinton HIV/AIDS Initiative, the Global Fund, UNITAID) this improved. The country's HIV-AIDS campaign focuses solely on prevention rather than cure, and that prevention is of questionable success.

== Criticism ==
The scope of Uganda's success has come under scrutiny from new research. Research published in The Lancet medical journal in 2002 questions the dramatic decline reported. It is claimed statistics have been distorted through the inaccurate extrapolation of data from small urban clinics to the entire population, nearly 90% of whom live in rural areas. Also, recent trials of the HIV drug nevirapine have come under intense scrutiny and criticism.

US-sponsored abstinence promotions have received recent criticism from observers for denying young people information about any method of HIV prevention other than sexual abstinence until marriage. Human Rights Watch says that such programs "leave Uganda’s children at risk of HIV". Alternatively, the Roman Catholic organization Human Life International says that "condoms are adding to the problem, not solving it" and that "The government of Uganda believes its people have the human capacity to change their risky behaviours."

It is feared that HIV prevalence in Uganda may be rising again; at best it has reached a plateau where the number of new HIV infections matches the number of AIDS-related deaths. There are many theories as to why this may be happening, including the government’s shift from abstinence-based prevention programs, and a general complacency or 'AIDS fatigue'. It has been suggested that anti-retroviral drugs have changed the perception of AIDS from a death sentence to a treatable, manageable disease; this may have reduced the fear surrounding HIV, and in turn have led to an increase in risky behaviour. Although prevention interventions, like safe male circumcision, have been shown to effectively reduce HIV transmission, studies in Uganda have shown delayed uptake of these interventions and attributed this to debate over evidence by high-level leaders.

Although abstinence has always been part of the country’s prevention strategy it has come under scrutiny since 2003 following significant investment of money for abstinence-only programs from PEPFAR, the American government’s initiative to combat the global HIV/AIDS epidemic. It is felt that PEPFAR has shifted the focus of prevention in Uganda from the comprehensive ABC approach of earlier years. PEPFAR is channelling large sums of money through pro-abstinence and even anti-condom organisations that are faith-based, and believe sexual abstinence should be the central pillar of the fight against HIV. Abstinence-only is also being encouraged by evangelical churches within Uganda, and by the First Lady, Janet Museveni.

This money is making a difference – some Ugandan teachers report being instructed by US contractors not to discuss condoms in schools because the new policy is 'abstinence only'. Dozens of billboards around the country have sprung up promoting only abstinence to prevent HIV infection and sometimes discouraging condom use. Some leaders of small community-based organisations also report they are aware that they are more likely to receive money from PEPFAR (which is the largest HIV-related donor to the country) if they mention abstinence in their funding proposal.

There have been calls for a more nuanced view of Uganda's response to HIV/AIDS. There is no doubt that there has been sustained, long term political commitment at the highest levels of government on this issue. In other countries such as Zimbabwe or South Africa, inept leadership has led to a serious crisis; some such as former President Thabo Mbeki deny the link between HIV and AIDS.

One aspect of the response to HIV in Uganda bridges the Millennium Development Goals and prevention—that is vertical transmission or Prevention of Mother To Child Transmission (PMTCT). Through the Global Fund's Born HIV Free campaign BornHIVFree the need and impact of PMTCT is made clear. Funding is encouraged by UNITAID and MassiveGood.

== Structure of health provision ==
The provision of all health services in Uganda is shared between three groups: the government staffed and funded medical facilities; private for profit or self-employed medics including midwives and traditional birth attendants; and, NGO or philanthropic medical services. The international health funding and research community, such as the Global Fund for AIDS, TB and Malaria, or bilateral donors are very active in Uganda. Part of the success in managing HIV/AIDS in Uganda has been due to the cooperation between the government and the non-government service providers and these international bodies. Public Private Partnerships in Health are often mentioned in Europe and North America to fund construction or research. In Uganda, it is more practical being the recognition by the (public) government and (public) donor that a (private) philanthropic health facility can receive free test kits for HIV screening, free mosquito nets and water purification to reduce opportunistic infections and free testing and treatment for basic infections of great danger to PLHA.

== Alternative proposals ==
Several studies, conducted in Uganda and its neighbours, indicate that adult male circumcision may be a cost-effective means of reducing HIV infection. A 2007 review of studies about the acceptability of adult male circumcision indicated the median proportion of uncircumcised men willing to become circumcised was 65 percent (range 29–87 percent). Sixty nine percent (range 47–79 percent) of women favoured circumcision for their partners, and 71 percent (range 50–90 percent) of men and 81 percent (range 70–90 percent) of women were willing to circumcise their sons. The national AIDS Indicator survey in 2011 also indicated that over 48 percent of adult men were willing to be circumcised, generating a critical mass of demand for male circumcision.

An economic analysis by Bertran Auvert, a physician from the INSERM U687, Saint-Maurive, France, and colleagues estimated the cost of a roll-out over an initial 5-year period would be $1,036 million ($748 – $1,319 million) and $965 million ($763 – $1301 million) for private and public health sectors, respectively. The cumulative net cost over the first 10 years was estimated at $1,271 million and $173 million for the private and public sectors, respectively.

== See also ==
- HIV/AIDS in Africa
- Health in Uganda
- Gideon Byamugisha
- Noerine Kaleeba
- Joseph Konde-Lule
- Philly Lutaaya
- Roy Mugerwa
- Fred Nalugoda
- Sex for Fish
- Traditional and Modern Health Practitioners Together against AIDS
- Uganda AIDS Orphan Children Foundation
