= Barbara Kemigisa =

- Born: 1986 (age 39–40); Uganda
- Occupations: HIV activist, motivational speaker, artist
- Known for: Founding Pill Power Uganda, repurposing ARV drug bottles
- Awards: Mandela Washington Fellowship (2018)

Barbara Kemigisa (born in 1986) is a Ugandan HIV activist, motivational speaker, and artist. She has dedicated her life to encouraging and directing children and young individuals who are also impacted by HIV, after undergoing childhood sexual abuse and living with the condition. Kemigisa is the founder of Pill Power Uganda, an organization that establishes a secure environment for vulnerable children and youth to develop essential life skills.

== Background ==
Barbara Kemigisa faced challenges from a young age. She experienced sexual abuse from her uncles between the ages of six and eleven, which resulted in a difficult adolescence characterized by risky behaviors. These experiences turned into a mission to support others dealing with similar struggles.

== Career ==
Kemigisa is acknowledged for her innovative approach to combating HIV stigma. Flowerpots, trash cans, and chairs are some of the functional and decorative items that she creates from empty antiretroviral (ARV) drug bottles. This initiative promotes environmental sustainability while serving as a powerful symbol of resistance and adherence to HIV treatment. Kemigisa has participated in notable international conferences, including International Conference on Recycling and Waste Management in Singapore 2015, IAS in Paris and AIDS 2018 in Amsterdam; In 2018, she was awarded a fellowship to study civic leadership at Wagner College, New York City, through the Mandela Washington Fellowship for Young African Leaders. Various youth groups have adopted her recycling campaign which has contributed to conserving the environment while creating awareness about HIV/AIDS infections among people in Uganda.

Being the founder of the organization, Kemigisa offers a forum for young persons with AIDS to interact and develop themselves in terms of their own characters and their trading. These activities incorporate aspects of farming, recycling, art and craft, music and dance as well as drama. Pill Power Uganda has reached over 50,000 youth and trained 400 children and adolescents, significantly impacting their lives and reducing the stigma associated with HIV. Kemigisha also works with Counselor at Makerere University Business School.

== Personal life ==
Barbara Kemigisa happens to be a mother who remained pregnant when she first detected she had the human immune virus. She has been able to adhere closely to her drugs thus making her viral load remain undetectable despite the difficult situation. Openly, she tells people about herself and makes sure they learn a lesson from what happened to her so that they could also feel motivated.

== See also ==
- Chris Baryomunsi
- Gideon Byamugisha
- Gaetano Kagwa
- Noerine Kaleeba
