= AIDS Information Centre =

AIDS Information Centre - Uganda
- Abbreviation: AIC
- Formation: 14 February 1990
- Type: Non-Profit Organization
- Headquarters: Kampala, Uganda
- Location: plot 1321 musajja - Alumbwa road
- Region served: National with 8 Regional Service cent.
- Staff: 140
- Website: http://www.aicug.org

AIDS Information Centre-Uganda (AIC) is a non-governmental organization in Uganda established in 1990 to provide Voluntary Counseling and Testing (VCT) for Human Immune Deficiency Virus (HIV). The organization was founded as a result of growing demand from people who wanted to know their HIV status. At the time of founding, the HIV/AIDS in Uganda was high.

AIC currently offers HIV counselling and testing services through 8 branches of Kampala, Jinja, Mbale, Mbarara, Arua, Lira, Soroti and Kabale, selected hospitals, health centres, and antenatal clinics. AIC also conducts HCT outreaches to communities and institutions targeting the most at-risk populations. AIC supported the Uganda Ministry of Health to extend HCT services nearer to the communities by supporting HCT in 33 districts in Uganda with over 200 district health facilities benefiting.

By December 2010, AIC had served over 2,959,193 clients. The number keeps growing and for the last 3 years over 300,000 clients annually are being served using the different approaches for HCT.

To consolidate its HIV counselling and testing services in the country, AIC has adopted a new vision as ‘Universal knowledge of HIV status in Uganda’ and its mission as ‘to provide HIV and AIDS information and quality HCT services’ and this will be through to 2015.

== How AIC works ==
AIC is now a membership organisation, with a functional board of trustees (BOT), 8 branch advisory committees (BACs) and just over 3000 members all over Uganda. Headed by the executive director, AIC now employs 140 full-time staff that include managers, coordinators, supervisors, medical and non-medical counsellors and medical officers and support staff.

AIC has a wide range of stakeholders with whom it works, including government ministries, development partners and other agencies involved in HIV and AIDS work. Major stakeholders include Centers for Disease Control and Prevention (CDC), United States Agency for International Development (USAID), Department for International Development (DFID), European Union (EU), Ministry of Health (MoH), Uganda AIDS Commission (UAC), the AIDS Support Organization (TASO), District Local Governments among others.

== Services offered by AIC ==
=== HIV counselling and testing services ===
AIC uses a multi-faceted approach in order to increase accessibility and HCT utilisation. Client initiated HCT is provided at the 8 AIC stand alone branches and outreaches. Targeted outreaches for the Most At Risk Populations (MARPs) are also conducted for these hard to reach populations that included commercial sex workers, Long Distance Truck Drivers and their clients, Fishing communities and Institutions of Higher learning. Commercial sex workers access HCT services during the peak hours of service delivery in order to benefit their clients. The truck drivers with their "service providers" are also another target group that AIC serves during evenings and nights at their transit stations. This HCT service delivery strategy is now referred to as the "Moonlight HCT services". For distant areas with difficult terrain, the community camping strategy is used. This is where HCT service providers camp in a community and provide services from the community for several days. This strategy is cost effective in terms of fuel, wear and tear and ensured service delivery to all potential clients. This strategy also promotes community involvement as mobilisation is done through the existing community structures. HCT is also offered to pregnant women both at the branches and at the supported health units where HCT is offered to all pregnant women as part of their routine ante-natal medical check up.

HIV Counselling and Testing (HCT) service are offered daily (even on Sundays and public holidays on appointments) at an affordable user fee in AIC main branches. Free HCT is also provided to children and youth below 24 years of age and Most At Risk Population. AIC is currently the largest single Non-governmental Organisation (NGO) HCT service provider in the country contributing at least 26 -30% of the total number of individuals tested for HIV in the country in any a given year.

== Palliative care ==
AIC contributes to the goal of the National Strategic Plan in care and treatment by offering Palliative Care Basic – Health Care (PCBHC). PCBHC includes psychosocial support, screening for and treatment of opportunistic infections (including Tuberculosis), as well as the provision of the basic health care package. The basic health care package includes prevention of malaria, respiratory and central nervous system diseases among PLHAs.

=== Psychosocial Support ===
Clients that are HIV positive are encouraged to live positively. This is provided by counsellors to clients during one on one session or in Post Test clubs.

=== TB/HIV Integration ===
AIC is guided by the National Policy guidelines for TB/HIV collaborative activities in Uganda. The overall goal of the policy is to decrease the burden of tuberculosis and HIV in Uganda through improved TB and HIV collaborative interventions. AIC employs a screening tool developed in collaboration with Centres for Disease Control and prevention (CDC) to screen HIV positive clients for TB This is done in the 8 branches of AIC and the supported sites

=== Screening and treatment of other opportunistic Infections ===
AIC screens and treats sexually transmitted infections like syphilis and Herpes simplex type II and other opportunistic infections like skin infections, pneumonias and others in all its eight branches. Among the integrated services offered are education and counselling on Reproductive health issues for the HIV positive and offering of Family Planning (FP) suitable to individual circumstances and choice.

=== Basic Care Packages (BCP) ===
HIV positive clients receives basic care packages consisting of mosquito nets, water guard chemical and a safe water vessel, condoms, Septrin for prophylaxis and reading material on psychosocial counselling to all HIV positive clients. This Package helps in prevention of malaria, respiratory, central nervous system diseases among PLHAs. This was achieved through partnership with PSI.

=== Cotrimoxazole prophylaxis ===
A daily dose of Cotrimoxazole has been proven to prolong life (25-50% decrease in mortality) and reduce the incidence of malaria, diarrhoea, toxoplasmosis, certain respiratory infections, blood infections (Septicaemia) and other illnesses affecting PLHA.

== CD4 Monitoring ==
AIC started offering this service in 2004 at AIC Kampala but has now expanded to cover all the 8 branches. The service is offered to the all HIV positive clients after VCT and are able to pay the user fee for the CD4/CD8+ count, any client with evidence of a positive HIV test and referral document from a recognized centre and clients already on ARVS with referral for monitoring.

== Research and Documentation ==
AIC being the pioneer HCT organization in Uganda, and with over 20 years of work, AIC has continued play a leading role in driving or influencing policy and practice in the area of HCT. AIC has made deliberate efforts to promote its corporate image among its clients, development partners and central government agencies.

AIC conducts operational research to generate answers to emerging questions and provide evidence-based data on HCT. Through its research and documentation activities with its partners, AIC has supported to the public to access evidence-based information on HCT and its related services through various channels, including the print materials, radio, video, the resource centre and website.

== Capacity Building for HIV Counselling and Testing ==
AIC trains HIV/AIDS Counselors, Trainer of Trainers, Counselor supervisors, Laboratory technicians, Data entrants, Voluntary counseling and testing promoters, and People living with HIV/AIDS who have accepted to go public. AIC provides training within and outside Uganda in HCT; HIV prevention, care, adherence, and support.

== Youth Friendly Services ==
AIC provides specially designed HCT to meet the special needs of young people, aged 12 to 24 free of charge with same day results. This followed a study conducted to identify opportunities and barriers for providing VCT to youth. With trained peer counselors, a private waiting room and lab, the environment is youth friendly, satisfying the need for privacy. Youth can also access all other AIC services including referral to youth friendly service organizations. AIC also provides HCT for children below age 12. To date AIC has established seven youth corners at seven AIC branches.

== HIV Prevention Programme ==
AIC has continued to contribute towards the national efforts to fight the drivers of the epidemic. Appropriate messages are delivered depending on the nature of the client and community.

=== Abstinence, Be faithful and condom use ===
Abstinence messages encourage young clients to abstain or delay their sex debut. The messages delivered give the client the advantages of abstaining, and give role models in society who abstained and have been successful in their lives. AIC delivers abstinence messages to young people in and out of school through educational talks, music and drama outreaches and HIV counselling sessions at HCT service delivery sites.

Recent studies indicate an escalating HIV prevalence among people who are currently married or cohabiting and those that have ever been married. Statistics from the AIC database corroborate these findings. AIC uses community dialogues, music and drama and HIV counselling in the provision of "Be faithful" messages to the target audience who are sexually active clients.

The need for promotion of correct and consistent use of condoms remains vital because majority of high risk populations (MARPS) do not know the correct use of the condoms while those that know, do not use them consistently. Condoms are distributed through PTC condom distribution outlets, AIC branch offices and other targeted points such as bars and lodges.

=== Know Your HIV Status Clubs ===
The Uganda Demographic and Health Survey (UDHS), 2006 indicated that although most people had some knowledge about HIV, only about 30 percent of women and 40 percent of men had comprehensive knowledge. In order to bridge this gap and increase comprehensive knowledge about HIV and to increase access to care and support for clients who have tested HIV positive, AIC established the Know Your HIV Status Clubs at parish level in 9 districts of Uganda in 2010.

A Know Your HIV Status Club (KYHSC) is an association of 20 members at parish level who have been selected by the community to pass on messages to households on HIV and AIDS prevention and care. These members are drawn from the existing district structures such as Village Health Teams, Community Resource Persons, PHA Network Support Agents, Post Test Club members and other structures. The major role of the twenty members is to disseminate information on comprehensive HIV and AIDS prevention package at household level.

== Post Test Services ==
The AIC Post Test Club (PTC) was established on August 4, 1990, in support of the national effort to prevent further spread of HIV and AIDS and to provide psychosocial support to those infected and affected by HIV. The purpose of the club is to respond to the expressed needs of the clients for ongoing support services. The major objective is to offer on-going psychosocial support to the members irrespective of their HIV status. All the eight AIC regional centres have PTC's and over 20 district based PTCs in Uganda are supported .

The services range from on-going support counselling, educational talks, condom promotion, community mobilization to distribution of Information Education Communication (IEC) materials among others.

=== AIC Couple Club ===
In the recent past, AIC realized that the cases of HIV discordance among couples were on the rise. HIV test results showed that at least 8% of all couples tested have one HIV positive while the other is negative. The Couple Club support couples socially and psychologically, enabling them cope with denial, avoid blame, or violence. At the Discordant Couple Club, AIC provide: Ongoing psychosocial support; continuous education to prevent the infection of the HIV negative partner; peer psychosocial support groups through sharing experiences; promote positive living and provide education on treatment options. We also impart income generation skills for many of the clients.

=== Philly Lutaaya Initiative (PLI) ===
The PLI was established in September 1991 through the collaborative efforts of TASO, World Learning Inc., AIC and UNICEF. PLI was formed after the death of the renowned Ugandan musician Philly Lutaaya Bongole the first Ugandan to publicly declare that he was infected with HIV. The objective of the PLI was to bring the reality of HIV and AIDS to the general affected communities and to demonstrate that people living with HIV and AIDS (PHAs) can lead a healthy and productive life.
