= CNN (disambiguation) =

CNN is the Cable News Network, a television network based in Atlanta, Georgia, United States.

CNN may also refer to:

== Arts, media, and entertainment ==
=== Television ===
- HLN (TV channel), a spin-off of CNN, formerly known as CNN2 and CNN Headline News
- CNN International, a U.S.-based television network broadcast worldwide
- CNN en Español, a Spanish-language version of CNN, based in Atlanta, Georgia, United States
- CNN Chile, a Chilean-based version of CNN
- CNN Airport, a former CNN specialty channel for air travelers
- CNN+, a defunct news streaming service
- CNN+ (TV network), a former Spain-based version of CNN
- CNN-News18, an India-based news channel
- CNN Türk, a Turkish-based version of CNN
- CNN Indonesia, an Indonesian-based version of CNN
- CNN Arabic, an Arabic-language version of CNN, based in Atlanta, Georgia
- CNNj, a Japanese-language version of CNN, based in Atlanta, Georgia
- CNN Philippines, a defunct Philippine-based version of CNN
- CNN Portugal, a Portuguese-based version of CNN
- CNN Brazil, a Brazilian-based version of CNN

=== Other uses in arts, media, and entertainment ===
- CNN Interactive (CNN.com), the CNN website
- WCNN, a sports-talk radio station in Atlanta, Georgia, United States
- Capone-N-Noreaga (C-N-N), an American hip-hop duo
- CNN, later XC-NN, a band formed by All About Eve's Tim Bricheno
- "CNN", a song by Baboon from the 1991 album Ed Lobster
- "CNN", a song by Zebda from the 1992 album L'arène des rumeurs

== Science and technology ==
- Cellular neural network, a parallel computing paradigm
- Convolutional neural network, a type of feedforward neural network
- Condoms, needles, and negotiation, an approach to reducing sexually transmitted diseases
- Centrosomin, a protein in Drosophila melanogaster

== Other uses ==
- Phổ Thông Chuyên Ngoại Ngữ (Foreign Languages Specializing School), a public magnet high school in Vietnam
- Cerro Negro Norte, an iron mine in Chile
- Canonbury railway station, England (National Rail code: CNN)
- Kannur International Airport, India (IATA code: CNN)
