= Wilton Sebastian Kezala =

Ugandan medical educationist, academic administrator and nurse

Academic administrator Wilton Sabastian Kezala Wakooli
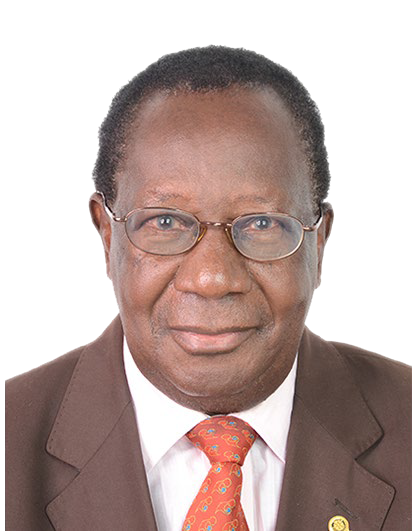
- Wilton Sabastian Kezala (2023)
- Citizenship: Uganda
- Occupations: Medical educationist, academic administrator
- Title: Professor

Academic background
- Education: McGill University Ottawa University Tororo College

Wilton Sebastian Kezala Wakooli (born 24 May 1938) is a Ugandan professor, academic administrator, medical educationist, researcher, and nurse. He co-founded the International Institute of Health Sciences (IIHS), Uganda in 1998. He served as chairman for the Uganda Nurses and Midwives Examinations Board (UNMEB). He is a co-founder and former chairman of the Uganda Private Health Training Institutions Association (UPHTIA). He is a former secretary general for the AIDS Support Organization (TASO) Uganda and also Busoga kingdom. He is the executive director of the International Institute of Health Sciences (IIHS). He served also served as a consultant for the World Health Organization (WHO) at Cuttington University College (CUC) in the Division of Nursing.

== Background and education ==
Kezala was born on 24 May 1938 in Nakabira in Nakabira village in Buyende District to Leo Merewoma Matege and Marita Babirye.

Kezala obtained his primary level education from Kamuli primary school. He attended Jinja College for his O level and Tororo College for his A level. He completed both his postgraduate diploma in Nursing and Medical Education in 1969, and a Bachelor of Science in Nursing and Medical Education in 1970 from Ottawa University in Canada. He graduated with a Master of Science in Nursing, Medical Education, Administration and Research from McGill University, Canada in 1972. In 1990, Kezala completed his post graduate as an associate professor in Medical and Nursing Education from Cuttington University in Liberia.

== Career ==
Kezala served as a nursing officer at both Mulago National Referral Hospital and Jinja Regional Referral Hospital from 1965 to 1968. From 1977 to 2008, he served as a lecturer in the Faculty of Medicine at Nairobi University, department of Nursing at Botswana University, faculty of Health Sciences at Namibia University and Institute of Public Health at Makerere University. He served as an associate professor in the Department of Nursing at Cuttington University. He was an external examiner for the Department of Nursing at Zambia University.

In 1985, Kezala served as a consultant for the World Health Organization (WHO) consultant at Cuttington University College (CUC) in the Division of Nursing. He was a facilitator in Suakoko District at the West African College of Nursing (WACN)/ Strengthening Health Delivery System (SHDS) curriculum workshop.

In 1998, he co-founded the International Institute of Health of Health Sciences, Uganda in 1998 in Jinja together with his wife, Margaret Taitika Kezala. In 2001, International Institute of Health of Health Sciences was classified as a medical institute by Ministry of Education and Sports, and was issued an operational license together with the Nurses and Midwives council.

From 1999 to date (as of 2024), Kezala has served as the executive director for International Institute of Health of Health Sciences in Uganda. He also served as an associate professor and principal for International Institute of Health of Health Sciences.

Kezala was the chairman for Health Management Committee for Jinja Municipal Council from 1999 to 2006. He served as the chairman of the board for the Uganda Nurses and Midwives Examinations Board (UNMEB) from 2010 to 2016.

He served as a principal of Health Tutors' College Kampala, at the Ministry of Health in the government of Uganda from 1973 to 1977, and was a member of the governing council of Health Tutors' College – Makerere University from 2010 to 2016.

In 2016, Kezala led a committee that was going to review the annual action plans on an annual basis to ensure successful implementation of the strategic plan under the support that was offered to Uganda Private Health Training Institutions Association (UPHTIA) by the USAID/Uganda private Health Support Program for five years.

In 2021, Kezala lodged a copyright or neighbouring rights registration application for his works "Research guidelines for student nurses and wives" and "application of scientific principles in patient care" with the registrar of copyright.

He has served as the chairman of the Uganda Private Health Training Institutions Association (UPHTIA) from 2011 to date (as of 2024).

Kezala was inaugurated as the president of Rotary Club of Jinja succeeding Mutyabule Wanume on 30 June 2001, and served from 2001 to 2002. He also served as the assistant governor Eastern region of Uganda, District 9200 Rotary International from 2005 to 2007 and he became the country director of District 9200 Rotary International in 2008.

== Personal life ==
Kezala is married to Margaret Taitika Kezala (a retired nurse), who is the mother of his children.

== Research, publications and authorship ==
- 1972, "The Comfort of patients in Traction: a descriptive study"
- 1989, "Study of the knowledge, attitudes and practices of parents on open mole in children"
- 2015, "Assessment of Nursing and Midwifery Students in Uganda: The UNMEB Experience", the International Atomic Energy Agency (IAEA) Conference
