= Adjoa Amana =

Ghanaian diplomat

Adjoa Amana is a Ghanaian former official within World Health Organization (WHO) and United Nations Population Fund (UNFPA), credited by UNFPA as being the "driving force behind the first behaviour change campaign to significantly reduce HIV prevalence." The campaign was called the Ugandan Information, Education and Communication Campaign (IEC) or the Health Education Campaign, and Adjoa Amana was its driving force between 1987 and 1990. She became aware that the prominent Ugandan singer Philly Lutaaya had AIDS. This was used in the communication campaign to make sure "AIDS had a face". Her and Lutaayas work was covered in the TV program "FRONTLINE / AIDS Quarterly Special Report; Born in Africa".

After retiring from international public service, Adjoa Amana has worked with out-of-school children and children on the streets in Ghana, founding the "Enhancing Youth Education and Health (EYEH) Soup Kitchen". The project received GH¢15,000 by the Rebecca Akufo-Addo, the first lady of Ghana, and her Rebecca Foundation.
