= Noerine Kaleeba =

Ugandan activist

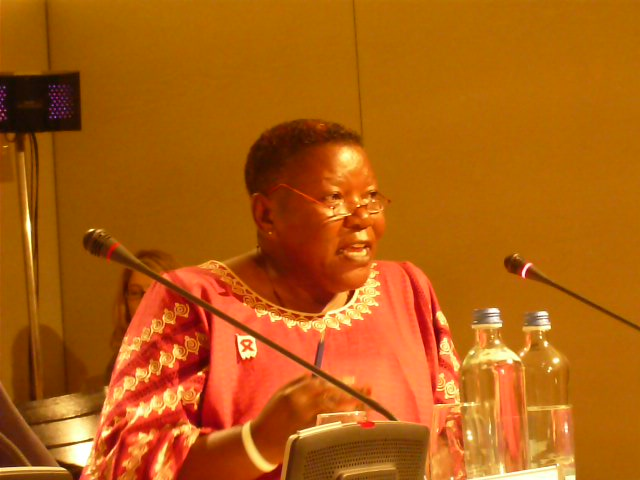
- Born: Noerine Kaleeba; Uganda
- Occupations: AIDS activist & physiotherapist

Noerine Kaleeba is a Ugandan physiotherapist, educator and AIDS activist. She is the co-founder of the AIDS activism group The AIDS Support Organization (TASO). She is currently a program development adviser for the Joint United Nations Programme on HIV/AIDS (UNAIDS).

== Background ==
https://escolapau.uab.cat/img/qcp/war_peace_uganda.pdfShe has worked as a physiotherapist at Mulago Hospital, and was the principal of Mulago School of Physiotherapy until 1987.

== TASO ==
In June 1986, Kaleeba received a call that her husband, Christopher, had become very sick while he was in England working on his master's in sociology and political science. He was diagnosed with AIDS. He died in January 1987, which caused Kaleeba to co-found a support group that same year, The AIDS Support Organization (TASO). The goal of the organization was to help provide support to people who have been diagnosed with AIDS, and their loved ones. The organization provides families of those who are infected with information about the disease and ways to provide care, without becoming infected with the disease as well. The organization also offers care, support and counseling, and mobilizes communities and neighborhood care for people with HIV/AIDS and their families. Based on the concept of "positive living", TASO was one of the first community responses to AIDS in Africa, and is today one of the leading examples in AIDS care and support and community education for prevention in resource-limited settings.

Kaleeba worked as the executive director of TASO Uganda for eight years until 1995 when she retired, and was elected patron of the TASO movement.

== Current ==
Kaleeba still holds the position of patron of the TASO movement. She also works as a program development adviser, Africa, for the Joint United Nations Programme on HIV/AIDS (UNAIDS). Since January 1996, she has been based at their secretariat in Geneva.

== Accomplishments ==
Kaleeba is the recipient of the following:

- Honorary Doctorate of Laws from Nkumba University, Uganda, 2002
- Doctor of Law degree at the University of Dundee, Scotland, 2005
- Honorary Doctorate of International Relations (DIR) by the Geneva School of Diplomacy and International Relations, June 2009
- Snr. Ashoka Fellow (2014)

She has been awarded several international awards in recognition of her national and global anti-AIDS efforts, including:

- The Belgian International King Baudouin Prize for Development, awarded to TASO in 1995
- Doctor of Humane Letters, Honorius Causa, in 2000

Kaleeba has served on various national and international bodies, including:

- The World Health Organization Global Commission on HIV/AIDS
- The Global AIDS Policy Coalition
- The Uganda AIDS Commission
- Chairperson for Action Aid International (2009)

She has been a trustee of international NGO boards such as Maristopes International, Noah's Ark (Sweden), and is currently vice-chair of ActionAid.

Her book, We Miss You All: AIDS In The Family, is an account of how HIV/AIDS enteredo her life, and how she came to be on the front lines fighting the disease.

== See also ==
- HIV/AIDS in Uganda
- Uganda AIDS Orphan Children Foundation
