= Christine Ondoa =

Ugandan physician and medical administrator

Christine J.D Ondoa
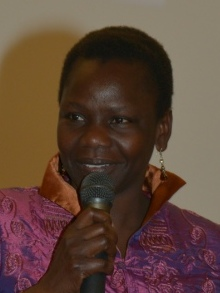
- Born: 21 October 1968 (age 57); Moyo, Uganda
- Citizenship: Uganda
- Education: Makerere University (MBChB) (MMed Pediatrics); Uganda Management Institute (Diploma in Public Administration & Management) (MA in Management Studies); Institute for National Transformation (honorary PhD)
- Occupations: Pediatrician, consultant physician, medical administrator
- Years active: 1994–present
- Title: Director general Uganda AIDS Commission
- Spouse: Thomas Udong P'ongona

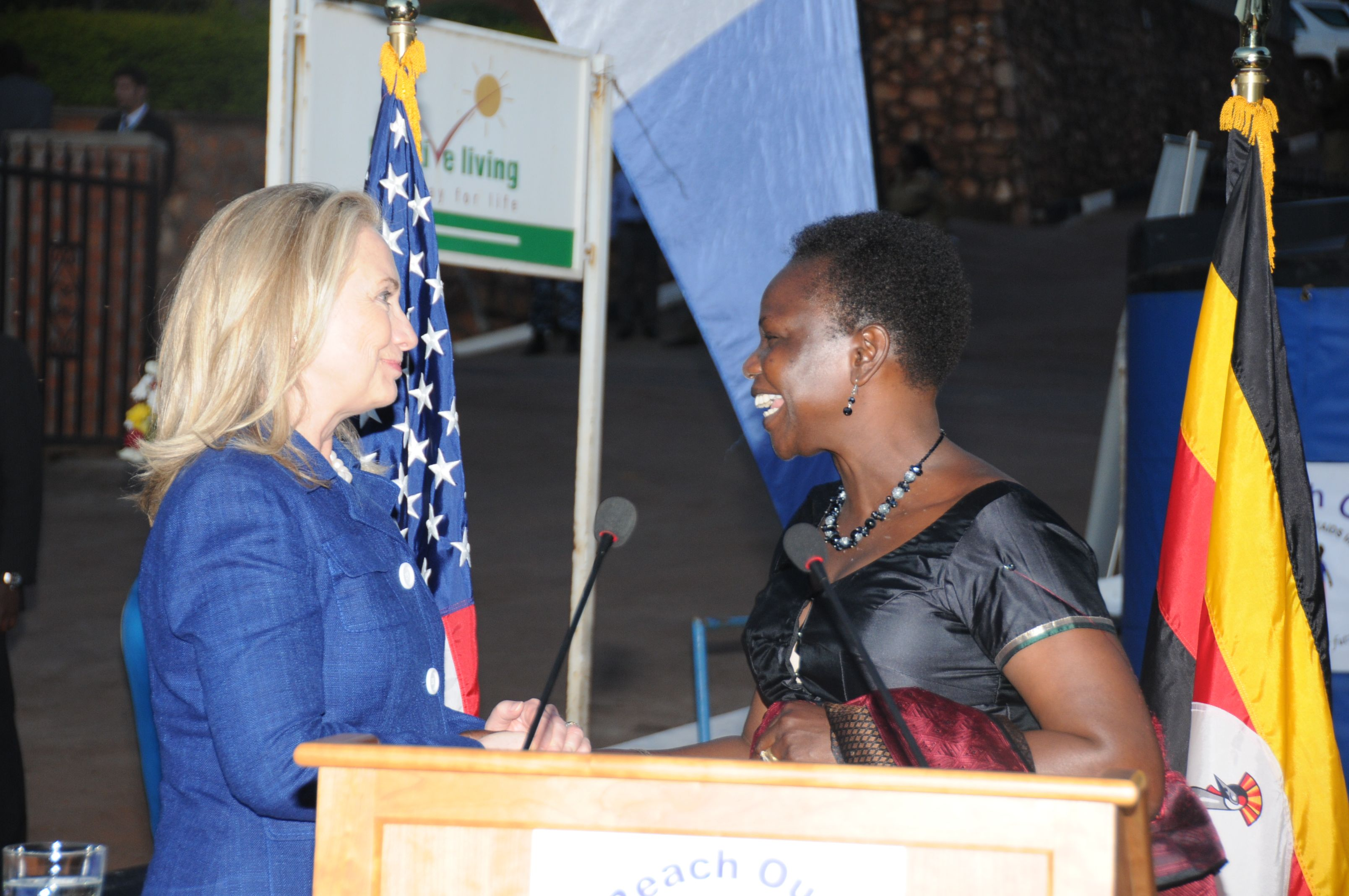
Hillary Rodham Clinton greeting Ondoa

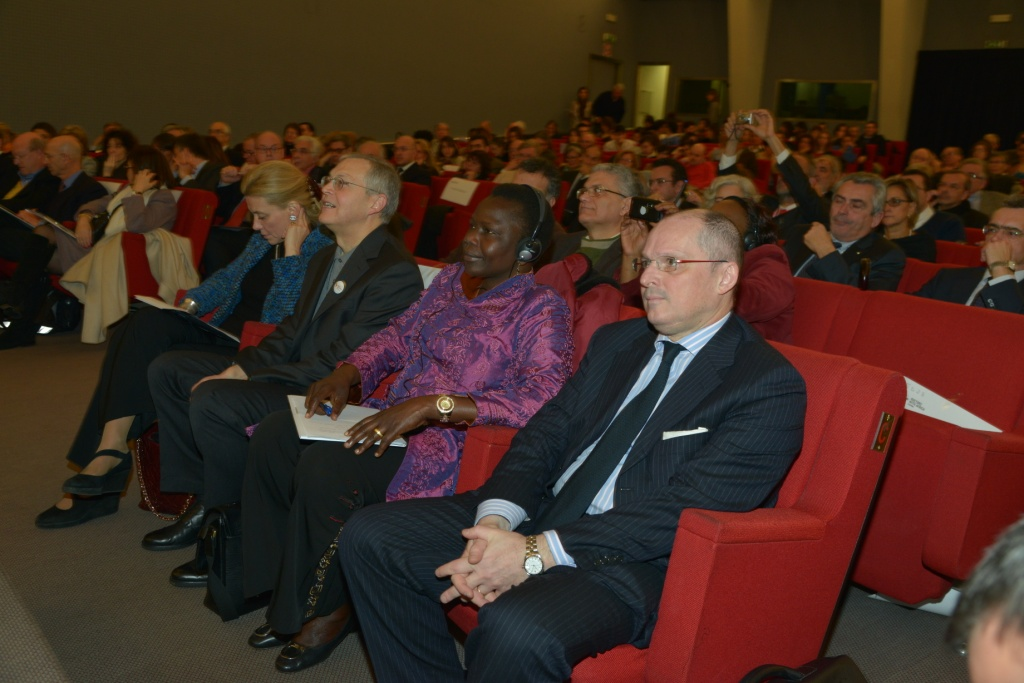
Elisabetta Belloni, Don Dante Carraro, Christine Ondoa and Walter Ricciardi at the Doctors with Africa Cuamm conference on the "Mothers and Children First" project

Christine Joyce Dradidi Ondoa is a physician and medical administrator who is regarded as one of Uganda's finest leaders, especially in ensuring that the quality of health service delivery in Uganda is improved, and discipline and ethical code of conduct among health workers is observed. She is a Ugandan paediatrician and Christian leader.

She currently serves as the director general of the Uganda AIDS Commission. She was appointed to that position by the president of Uganda in February 2014. Prior to that, she served as a senior presidential advisor to President Yoweri Kaguta Museveni on Public Health. She was a member of the board of directors of the Global Alliance for Vaccines and Immunization (GAVI). She was Minister of Health in the Ugandan Cabinet from 2011 to 2013. She was appointed to that position on 27 May 2011, but was replaced by Ruhakana Rugunda on 23 May 2013. On account of being a cabinet minister, she was a member of the Ugandan Parliament, in an ex officio capacity. Prior to that, she was the executive director of Mbarara Regional Referral Hospital, one of the fourteen regional referral hospitals in Uganda.

== Early life and education ==
Ondoa was born in Moyo District on 21 October 1968.

She attended Mount Saint Mary's College Namagunga for her high school studies. She holds the degree of Bachelor of Medicine and Bachelor of Surgery (MBChB), obtained in 1994, from Makerere University Medical School (MUMS), the oldest medical school in East Africa. She also holds the degree of Master of Medicine in Pediatrics (MMed), obtained in 2000, also from MUMS. In March 2011, she graduated from the Uganda Management Institute with the postgraduate Diploma in Public Administration & Management (Dip.PA&M). In 2012 she graduated from the same institution with the degree of Master of Management Studies (MMS). She has now enrolled in the Institute of National Transformation for her PhD.

She did her internship at St. Francis Hospital Nsambya from 1994 until 1995. She stayed on at Nsambya from 1995 until 1997, when she went back to Makerere University Medical School for her postgraduate training in pediatrics.

Between 2000 and 2009, she worked in Arua Regional Referral Hospital as a consultant pediatrician. Between 2009 and 2010, she worked at Jinja Regional Referral Hospital as senior pediatrician and later promoted to hospital director and senior consultant pediatrician. She also served as the chairperson of the governing council for Jinja School of Nursing and Midwifery. From January 2011 until May 2011, she worked as the executive director at Mbarara Regional Referral Hospital, the teaching hospital of Mbarara University of Science and Technology (MUST). From May 2011 to May 2013, she was Uganda's Minister of Health.

== Personal details ==
Ondoa is the mother of a son named Reuben Azi, born in 1996.

She is a born-again Christian, and was ordained as pastor, on 23 April 2011, by Bishop Julius Peter Oyet at LifeLine Ministries at Mbuya, Nakawa Division, Kampala.

On 28 January 2012, Ondoa was married to Thomas Udong P'ongona at Church of the Resurrection, Bugolobi.

== See also ==
- Parliament of Uganda
- Cabinet of Uganda
- Ministry of Health (Uganda)
- Uganda AIDS Commission
