= Mount Saint Mary's College Namagunga =

Ugandan all-girls boarding secondary school

Location
- Namagunga, Mukono District; Uganda
- 00°22′21″N 32°53′01″E

Information
- Type: Public High School
- Motto: Per Scientiam Ad Virtutem (Through Knowledge to Virtue)
- Established: 1942; 84 years ago
- Head teacher: Reverend Sister Regina Nabawanuka, LSOSF
- Enrollment: 1,173 (2019)
- Athletics: Track, Tennis, Volleyball, Basketball and Golf
- Website: msmcnamagunga.ac.ug

Mount Saint Mary's College Namagunga is an all-girl boarding secondary school located in Mukono District in Uganda. The school is affiliated with the Roman Catholic Diocese of Lugazi.

== Location ==
The school is on the Kampala–Jinja Highway, approximately 42 kilometres (26 mi), by road, east of Kampala, Uganda's capital and largest city. Its location is approximately 8 kilometres (5 mi), by road, west of Lugazi, the nearest town, and approximately 18 kilometres (11 mi), by road, east of Mukono, where the district headquarters are located. The geographical coordinates of the school campus are 0°22'21.0"N, 32°53'01.0"E (Latitude:0.3725; Longitude:32.8836).

== Overview ==
The college was founded in February 1942 by Mother Mary Kevin of the Franciscan Sisters for Africa. It is among the best schools academically in Uganda at both the ordinary level ("O" Level), and at the advanced level ("A" Level), or high school.

== Prominent alumni ==
Some of the prominent alumni of the school include:

1. Josephine Nambooze, Emeritus professor of public health at Makerere University School of Public Health. Nambooze was the first female Ugandan to qualify as a physician circa 1959.
2. Specioza Kazibwe, Physician, politician, women's advocate. First African woman elected Vice President of Uganda, serving between 1994 and 2003.
3. Winnie Byanyima, aeronautical engineer, politician and diplomat. Executive director of Oxfam International (1 May 2013- 14 August 2019), current Executive Director UNAIDS, since 2019.
4. Christine Ondoa, Physician, politician, church minister. Former minister of health in Uganda 2011-2013. Executive director of the Uganda AIDS Commission.
5. Mary Okwakol, University professor, academic administrator, and zoologist. Former Vice chancellor of Busitema University. Current Chairperson of Uganda National Examinations Board.
6. Doris Akol, Former Commissioner general of the Uganda Revenue Authority.

Other prominent alumni include:

1. Sezi Mbaguta, Former Minister of State for public service.
2. Joan Kagezi (14 July 1967 - 30 March 2015), Lawyer and prosecutor. Was deputy director of Public Prosecution and head of the International Criminal Division in Uganda's Ministry of Justice.
3. Lydia Mugambe, a Ugandan lawyer and judge at the High Court of Uganda. Appointed to that court on 3 May 2013.
4. Irene Mulyagonja, Justice of the High Court of Uganda. Fourth Uganda Inspector General of Government (2012 until 2020).

== See also ==
- Education in Uganda
