= Rosemary Tumusiime =

Ugandan politician (born 1962)

Honorable

Personal details
- Born: Rosemary Tumusiime; 17 May 1962 (age 64) Entebbe, Uganda
- Citizenship: Uganda
- Spouse(s): Edward Gumizamu Tumusiime (Deceased)
- Education: National College of Business Studies (Higher Diploma in Marketing); Makerere University (Bachelor of Commerce)
- Occupation: Marketing professional, politician
- Known for: Public administration, politics

Rosemary Bikaako Tumusiime (born 17 May 1962) is a Ugandan marketing professional, public administrator, feminist and politician. She is the elected Member of Parliament for Entebbe Municipality and is a representative for NRM, the ruling political party in Uganda. She is the first female representative for the constituency in over three decades and succeeded Muhammad Kawuma who served for two consecutive terms from 2006 to 2016. In the 10th Parliament, she serves as a member of the Committee on Equal Opportunities and the Committee on Presidential Affairs. She is also a member of the NRM Parliamentary Caucus, the Buganda Parliamentary Caucusand the treasurer of the Network for African Women Ministers and Parliamentarians (NAWMP).

Prior to her political career, Tumusiime was a branch manager for Office Services, Supplies & Equipment (OSSE) Limited, a revenue inspector for the Civil Aviation Authority of Uganda (CAA), an assistant marketing officer and shipping assistant for Uganda Coffee Marketing Board and; a bookkeeping assistant and records assistant for the Ministry of Health. She is the founder member of UWESO Entebbe and served as the chairperson of the women organization's National Executive Committee from 2000 to 2006. She is also a former chairperson for TASO Entebbe, was the board chairperson of Success Microfinance Limited in 2010, the community advisory board chairperson of the International AIDS Vaccine Initiative (IAVI) from 2001 to 2013 and the chairperson of the Women's Network for Lake Victoria Region Local Authorities Cooperation (LVRLAC) from 2006 to 2012.

== Early life and education ==
Tumusiime was born in Entebbe Grade B Hospital, Entebbe, Wakiso District on 17 May 1962 in a Catholic family of the Tooro people, as the first born of eight children. Her father Robert Bikaako is a retired meteorologist, and her late mother Mary Bikaako was a school teacher.

She had her primary education in Entebbe town at St. Theresa Primary School and Lake Victoria School, acquiring her PLE certification in 1975. Tumusiime then attended Gayaza High School and Christ The King Secondary School Kalisizo for her O-Level education and Caltec Academy Makerere for her A-Level education, attaining an EACE certification in 1979 and a UACE certification in 1982. She was a librarian at Gayaza High School and a student leader at Christ The King Secondary School Kalisizo.

Tumusiime further advanced to the National College of Business Studies where she attained a Higher Diploma in Marketing in 1991 and then to Makerere University, where she graduated in 1999 with a Bachelor of Commerce.

== Career and politics ==
=== Professional career ===
Tumusiime started her career as a records assistant in 1980 and as a bookkeeping assistant in 1982 for the Ministry of Health (MOH). In 1988, she joined Uganda Coffee Marketing Board as a shipping assistant, a position she held up until 1996 when she was promoted to the superior position of assistant marketing officer. In 1997, Tumusiime joined the Civil Aviation Authority of Uganda as a revenue inspector, a position she held up until 2000 when she secured employment as the branch manager for Office Services, Supplies & Equipment (OSSE) Limited.

=== Political career ===
Tumusiime started out as an RCI Councillor for Kitooro Central in 1989 at the time when local councils (LCs) were still called resistance councils (RCs). In 1991, she was elected RCIII Councillor for Division B Entebbe and co-currently served as the Mpigi District Women Councillor for a three-year spell. In 2001, she was elected LCIV Councilor for Nakasamba, Kitasa, Kakeeka and Bugonga; a position the veteran Councillor held up until 2016 when she was elected member of parliament.

Tumusiime won both the NRM party's primaries in 2015 and the general elections in 2016 and became a member of the 10th Parliament for the Pearl of Africa representing Entebbe Municipality in Wakiso District. In the 10th Parliament, Tumusiime serves as the treasurer of the Network for African Women Ministers and Parliamentarians (NAWMP) and as a member of the Committee on Equal Opportunities and the Committee on Presidential Affairs. She is also a member of Uganda Women's Parliamentary Association (UWOPA), the Buganda Parliamentary Caucus, the Parliamentary Forum on Climate Change (PFCC), the Uganda Parliamentarians Forum on WASH (UPF-WASH), the Uganda Parliamentary Prayer Breakfast Fellowship and the NRM Parliamentary Caucus.

== Personal life ==
Rosemary Bikaako Tumusiime is the widow of Edward Gumizamu Tumusiime, a bush war veteran and former LCV Councillor for Division A Entebbe Municipality, who departed in 2013. They had four children: Edward Tumusiime Jr, Liz Tumusiime, Enos Tugume Tumusiime and the late Doreen Tashobya Tumusiime.

Also, Tumusiime was the Mothers Union treasurer and chairperson at St. John's Parish Church, Church of Uganda, Entebbe. She additionally served the Anglican church as the head of the Laity for the Archdeaconry of Entebbe from 2006 to 2014.

She is a member of the boards of governors of several schools in Entebbe, a vice chairperson for the National Executive Committee of Uganda Women's Effort to Save Orphans (UWESO), the chairperson of The AIDS Support Organization (TASO) Entebbe and is involved with many other small community groups.

== See also ==
- Wakiso District
- Entebbe
- National Resistance Movement
