= Abstinence, be faithful, use a condom =

Sex education policy

Abstinence, be faithful, use a condom, also known as the ABC strategy, abstinence-plus sex education or abstinence-based sex education, is a sex education policy based on a combination of "risk avoidance" and harm reduction which modifies the approach of abstinence-only sex education by including education about the value of partner reduction, safe sex, and birth control methods. Abstinence-only sex education is strictly to promote the sexual abstinence until marriage, and does not teach about safe sex or contraceptives. The abstinence-based sex education program is meant to stress abstinence and include information on safe sex practices. In general terms, this strategy of sex education is a compromise between abstinence-only education and comprehensive sex education. The ABC approach was developed in response to the growing epidemic of HIV/AIDS in Africa, and to prevent the spread of other sexually transmitted infections. This approach has been credited by some with the falling numbers of those infected with AIDS in Uganda, Kenya and Zimbabwe, among others. From 1990 to 2001, the percentage of Ugandans living with AIDS fell from 15% to between 5 and 6%. This fall is believed to result from the employment of the ABC approach, especially reduction in the number of sex partners, called "Zero-Grazing" in Uganda.

Abstinence-based sex education can include issues of human relationships, the basic biology of human reproduction, safe sex methods and contraceptives, HIV/AIDS information, and masturbation in place of sex. It recommends sexual abstinence outside marriage as an ideal, having only a single long-term sexual partner. The use of condoms and other safe sex practices is advocated only if it is not possible to remain with a single sexual partner. Advocating this ideal, whilst pragmatically dealing with the fact that abstinence only sex education is ineffective by itself, has made the ABC approach popular with many African governments and relief agencies.

The ABC approach has been used in African countries. Versions of this approach have been used for abstinence-only sex education in Uganda. Its positive impact has been confirmed by a 2009 Stanford University survey.

== Components ==
Abstinence, be faithful, use a Condom consists of three components:

- Abstinence: The ABC approach encourages young adults to delay "sexual debut" (age of first sexual intercourse), or to use abstinence until marriage, the most effective way to avoid HIV infection, as advocated as the ideal by Christianity. The program develops skills for practicing abstinence and encourages participants to adopt social norms that support abstinence.
- Be faithful: In addition to abstinence, the ABC approach encourages participants to eliminate casual or other concurrent sex partners and to practice fidelity within their marriages and other sexual relationships. This reduces exposure to HIV.
- Use a condom: The Catholic Church has publicly stated its opposition to condom use. However, in 2010, during an interview, Pope Benedict XVI addressed the use of condoms and his view that condoms are the "first step" of morality.

== United States ==
In the 1980s and 1990s, the popularity of the "abstinence plus" sex education program grew into a common method of teaching students, in the United States, about sexuality. The program understood that it would not be possible to stop all teenagers from having sex, but still stressed that abstinence is the only guaranteed way of avoiding unwanted pregnancies and contraction of STIs. The most important message to teens from the program comes from Joycelyn Elders, President Clinton's first Surgeon General, that "if they have a baby there is an 80% likelihood they'll be poor, ignorant, and slaves for the rest of their lives." In 1997, the Department of Health and Human Services established a "Girl Power!" campaign focusing on girls ages 9–14 which encouraged abstinence as a form of empowerment. For those who would reject abstinence, or have early sex forced upon them, abstinence-only messages provided little to no hope to prevent pregnancy and spread of disease. To account for this, some states included information about contraceptives in their sex education programs along with encouragement for students to be abstinent. Of the states that, in 1995, required abstinence education, fourteen also included the use of contraception within the curriculum.

In September 1995, Hawaii passed the Abstinence-Based Education Policy (Policy # 2110). It is meant to support abstinence and help develop skills to continue abstinence, help teens who have had sexual intercourse to abstain from further, and to provide teens with information on contraceptives and methods for preventing sexually transmitted infections and pregnancy.

In 1996, the federal government increased funding for state abstinence education as an inclusion of the Welfare Reform Act, creating Title V, and the abstinence-only-until-marriage program. The increase in abstinence funding created incentives for states to maintain these rulings, which over 20 states have.

In 2006 and 2007, $176 million was given annually to abstinence-only programs, whose central message was to delay sexual activity until marriage, preventing the inclusion of information about safe-sex practices or contraception.

On June 30, 2009, funding was cut off for abstinence-only education programs, with no further fund allocated in the 2010 FY budget, and the push for evidence-based sex education and teen pregnancy prevention programs. However, on September 29, 2009, funding was restored to abstinence-only programs, as well as leaving the decision of what sex education program would be taught in public schools up to the individual states

The state of Texas, where the law states that comprehensive sex education is allowed to be taught, but 94% of school districts use abstinence-only sex education, developed an abstinence-plus sex education program called Big Decisions, which not only emphasized abstinence to high school students, but integrated education about condom use and contraception, contradicting the majority of the school districts' decisions to maintain an abstinence-only education program

== Africa ==
=== Uganda ===
Uganda has been touted as the success story of the ABC strategy, with a significant reduction of HIV/AIDS infection rates and a push towards sexual behavior change. This shift in sexual behavior began in the mid-1980s, when AIDS was a global disease, resulting in the reduction of multiple sexual partners for an individual, and the increase of condom use However, there is debate over whether the ABC strategy was the sole factor that contributed to the decline in HIV/AIDS infection. There has also been debate and discourse over the emphasis of one tenet of ABC sex education over the other. Currently there is the debate over the emphasis of "A" over "C" and vis versa. Uganda's HIV/AIDS and sex education program has a greater focus on the use of condoms in preventing HIV/AIDS, however, religious institutions emphasize abstinence. The success of the ABC strategy in sex education is in part due to the fact that the branches of this strategy are "proximate determinants of HIV infection", also known as ways of reducing or even avoiding the risk of infection.

=== Malawi ===
Like Uganda, there is a push to change the sexual behaviors, however, this message is being emphasized by religious leaders rather than state officials. The three tenets of ABC are broken down in Malawi into groups. Abstinence is emphasized for individuals who are young and unmarried, who hear messages about AIDS regularly; Be faithful is emphasized with married couples whose religious leader "polices" their sexual behavior; Condom use is a contested area with religious leaders due to the fact that religious openly denounce condom use, however, some leaders have privately consulted individuals on condom use, resulting in many members doing so. Despite that, religious leaders do not comment on the risks and issues of AIDS, which can potentially put an entire congregation at risk.

== Religious and ideological influences ==
Many communities that have adopted the ABC strategy of sex education have used this strategy of sex education in congruence with religious or ideological influences. In Malawi, religious leaders influence and emphasize the use this strategy

However, in the United States, political ideologies influence the use of ABC strategy. For example, conservatism had previously taught young women that sex was about danger, not pleasure, focusing on an abstinence-only education program. Political ideologies have long been influences in the debate over sex education programs.

Globally, the debate of sex education divides liberals and conservatives. In many countries, children do not receive proper sex education, and discourage the act of sex itself

== Responses ==
The usefulness of the ABC approach is highly debated. The three elements are interpreted differently by different actors and critics argue that often abstinence and faithfulness are unduly promoted over condoms and other measures such as education, female empowerment and making available modern antiviral drugs. For example, the U.S. President's Emergency Plan for AIDS Relief under President George W Bush has been criticized for seeming to prioritize "A" and "B" over "C" within its funding criteria. "C" activities may only be directed at "high-risk" groups, and not to the general population. However, donor funding has always been allocated overwhelmingly to condoms, reflecting clear US and European policy priorities, including under George W Bush.

=== Criticisms ===
Critics argue that in many countries women are frequently infected by their unfaithful husbands while being faithfully married, and thus women who follow the recommendations of ABC promoters face an increased risk of HIV infection. Condoms, needles, and negotiation is a proposed alternative approach among high-risk groups as is SAVE (Safer practices, Available medication, Voluntary testing & counseling and Empowerment through education).

Critics furthermore allege that the strategy overlooks the epidemic's social, political, and economic causes and "vulnerable populations", e.g. sex workers and "those who lack the ability to negotiate safe sex" as well as risk groups such as homosexuals and intravenous drug users. However, most infections in Africa occur outside these vulnerable groups, and ABC was a US donor policy only for the "generalized" epidemics in Africa. Murphy et al. found that Uganda's ABC approach empowered women. "Remarkably, in the 2000–2001 Uganda DHS, 91 percent of women said they could refuse sex with their husbands if they knew their husbands had STIs, a somewhat higher percentage than in several other African countries".

Critics also argue that using the word "abstinence," then teaching about safe sex and contraceptives, can be contradictory.

There is also the argument of the gendered presentation of ABC success stories. Research has indicated that the power roles in which men and women fall in the gender dynamic of relationships, as well as sexual double standards, sexual violence, and harmful cultural practices affect a greater number of women when trying to implement HIV/AIDS prevention through individual decision making. Critiques of geographic location are also relevant in the success of ABC success. Migration patterns within a population affect both men and women where men who migrate are more likely to contract the infection and bring it back and infect their female partner, whose greatest risk of contracting HIV is from their husbands extramarital sexual encounters, but women are also seen contracting the disease outside of their primary relationship, focusing the ABC strategy on morality and "static individualized behavior".

=== Debate in the US ===
How sex education should be taught in public schools in the United States has been a topic for debate since the sexual revolution. A majority of the debate is focused on whether or not there should be a comprehensive sex education program or an abstinence-only program.

Abstinence-only sex education programs have been proven to be ineffective and there is little evidence showing that abstinence-only, or abstinence-only-until-marriage programs lower risky sexual behavior in teens.

There is also evidence to support a parental push for earlier sex education for students, starting in elementary school rather than middle school. Along with the push for earlier sex education, there is the call for age-appropriate sex education. This means that for elementary school students, the sex education they receive will be tailored to their age. A study conducted in 2013 found that parents who pushed for earlier sex education settled on the sex education elementary school students receive will be 89% communication skills, 65% human anatomy/reproductive information, 61% abstinence, 53% HIV/STD infection information, and 52% gender/sexual orientation issues. Parents in this study also supported a greater emphasis on sex education in middle schools and an increase in the teaching of the same topics from elementary school as well as a greater emphasis on birth control and condom use.

=== Commentators ===
Pope Benedict XVI has criticized some harm reduction policies with regards to HIV/AIDS, saying that "if the soul is lacking, if Africans do not help one another, the scourge [of HIV] cannot be resolved by distributing condoms; quite the contrary, we risk worsening the problem". Whilst this position has been widely denounced for misrepresenting and oversimplifying the role of condoms in preventing infections, there has been expert scientific opinion and evidence supporting it.

Archbishop Gabriel Charles Palmer-Buckle of Accra has stated that "the Catholic Church [offers] three methods to help solve this problem of AIDS in Africa: "A", abstain; "B", be faithful; "C", chastity, which is in consonance with traditional African values. Those Planned Parenthood people are only talking about condoms. By the way, they know full well that the condoms devoted to Africa are sub-standard." There are no reliable sources that condoms distributed in Africa are inferior to those elsewhere in the world.

A major proponent of the ABC approach, author and member of Presidential Advisory Council on HIV/Aids in 2003–2007, Harvard University's Edward C. Green, said "Advocates of the ABCs often use the term to mean a primary emphasis on abstinence/delay of sexual debut and faithfulness/partner reduction, with condom use being a secondary but necessary strategy for those who do not or cannot practice abstinence or fidelity." Furthermore, Green in his seminal book Rethinking AIDS Prevention (Praeger 2003) argued that the success in Uganda, where prevalence fell 21% to 6% between 1989 and 2003, was largely due to the "B" of the ABC approach, fidelity or reduction in multiple partners. This conclusion was validated and expanded to underscore the dangers of concurrent sexual partners by Helen Epstein, in The Invisible Cure.
