= HIV community prevention delivery system in Uganda =

Community-based healthcare model in Uganda

- Country: Uganda
- Type: Community-based HIV prevention
- Coordinated by: Uganda AIDS Commission; Ministry of Health
- Delivered by: Community health workers, Village Health Teams, NGOs, faith-based organizations
- Key services: HIV testing, counselling, condom distribution, PrEP, VMMC, PMTCT, health education
- Major funders: PEPFAR; Global Fund
- Partners: UNAIDS, WHO

The HIV community prevention delivery system in Uganda refers to the network of community based mechanisms usedd to deliver HIV prevention services in Uganda. Rather than relying solely on hospitals and health centres, this approach brings prevention services, such as HIV testing, counselling, condom distribution, pre-exposure prophylaxis (PrEP) and health education directly into communities through community health workers, villages health teams, non-governmental organizations andt faith based organizations.

Community based delivery has long been part of Uganda's national HIV response, which is coordinated by the Uganda AIDS Commission and the Ministry of Health and supported by international partners including UNAIDS, the World Health Organisation (WHO), PEPFAR and the Global Fund.

== Background ==
Uganda was one of the first African countries to mount a large scale public response to the HIV/AIDS epidemic in the late 1980s and early 1990s. The national response of that period, often summarised by the "ABC" message (Abstain, Be faithful, use Condoms), has been widely discussed in public health literature, and HIV prevalence in Uganda declined during the 1990s. The epidemic later stabilised, and attentionshifted toward sustaining prevention gains and reaching populations harder to serve through facility based care.

== Delivery mechanisms ==
=== Community health worker and village Health Teams ===
Community health workers, including members of Uganda' village Health Teams (VHTs), provide health education, referrals and basic prevention services at the village level, linking communities to the health systems.

=== Community-based testing and self-testing ===
HIV testing is delivered outside health facilities through door to door campaigns, outreach events and mobile clinics. HIV self-testing has been promoted to increase uptake and reach people who do not attend clinics.

=== Other prevention services ===
Community channels also support condom distribution, pre-exposure prophylaxis, voluntary medical male circumcision (VMMC), and the prevention of mother-to-child transmission (PMTCT), as part of a combination-prevention strategy.

=== Outcomes and challenges ===
Community-based delivery has been credited with extending the reach of prevention services and improving test uptake. In the Rakai region, the scale-up of combination prevention has been associated with a decline in HIV incidence. Reported challenges include reliance on external funding, retention of community health workers, stigma, and reaching key populations.
