= Abstinence-only sex education =

Form of sex education

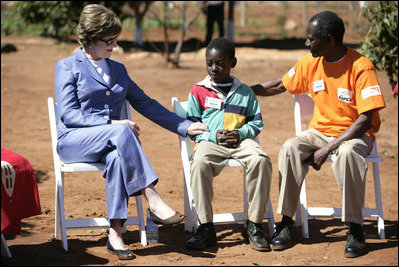
Laura Bush with an AIDS orphan at a center in Zambia that promotes abstinence and faith for youth

Abstinence-only sex education (also known as sexual risk avoidance education) is a form of sex education that teaches not having sex outside of marriage. It often excludes other types of sexual and reproductive health education, such as birth control and safe sex. In contrast, comprehensive sex education covers the use of birth control and sexual abstinence.

Evidence does not support the effectiveness of abstinence-only sex education. It has been found to be ineffective in decreasing HIV risk in the developed world. It does not decrease rates of sexual activity or unplanned pregnancy when compared to comprehensive sex education.

The topic of abstinence-only education is controversial in the United States, with proponents claiming that comprehensive sex education encourages premarital sexual activity, and critics arguing that abstinence-only education is religiously motivated and that the approach has been proven ineffective and even detrimental to its own aims.

== Description ==
Abstinence education teaches children and adolescents to abstain from sexual activity, and that this is the only certain method of avoiding pregnancy and sexually transmitted infections (STIs). With a heavy focus on the importance of "family values", programs also teach that abstinence until marriage is a standard by which to live. Since 2019, the federal government has spent $110 million annually on abstinence-only sex education.

In the U.S., states may apply for federal funding of abstinence-only sex education programs from either Title V, the Adolescent Family Life Act (AFLA), and/or Community-Based Abstinence Education (CBAE). To be eligible for funding, programs must satisfy requirements given under the Social Security Act, which is reproduced here verbatim:

(2) For purposes of this section, the term "abstinence education" means an educational or motivational program which—

(A) has as its exclusive purpose, teaching the social, psychological, and health gains to be realized by abstaining from sexual activity;
(B) teaches abstinence from sexual activity outside marriage as the expected standard for all school age children;
(C) teaches that abstinence from sexual activity is the only certain way to avoid out-of-wedlock pregnancy, sexually transmitted diseases, and other associated health problems;
(D) teaches that a mutually faithful monogamous relationship in context of marriage is the expected standard of human sexual activity;
(E) teaches that sexual activity outside of the context of marriage is likely to have harmful psychological and physical effects;
(F) teaches that bearing children out-of-wedlock is likely to have harmful consequences for the child, the child's parents, and society;
(G) teaches young people how to reject sexual advances and how alcohol and drug use increases vulnerability to sexual advances; and
(H) teaches the importance of attaining self-sufficiency before engaging in sexual activity.

Funding, which began in the 1980s, has continued to increase since its inception, though support for the programs and legislation surrounding them has become dependent upon the current administration. For example, George W. Bush administration increased federal funding for abstinence-only programs (the only type funded even under the previous Clinton Administration), while the Obama administration reversed the emphasis and provided more federal dollars for comprehensive sex education. President Donald Trump cut grants to comprehensive sex education and proposed increased funding for abstinence-only education. Increased funding continued through the Joe Biden administration.

== Effectiveness ==
Systematic reviews of research evaluating abstinence-only sex education have concluded that it is ineffective at preventing unwanted pregnancy or the spread of STIs, among other shortfalls. The American Academy of Pediatrics has recommended against the use of abstinence-only sex education because it has been found to be ineffective, and because the media frequently conveys information about non-abstinence.

=== STI transmission ===
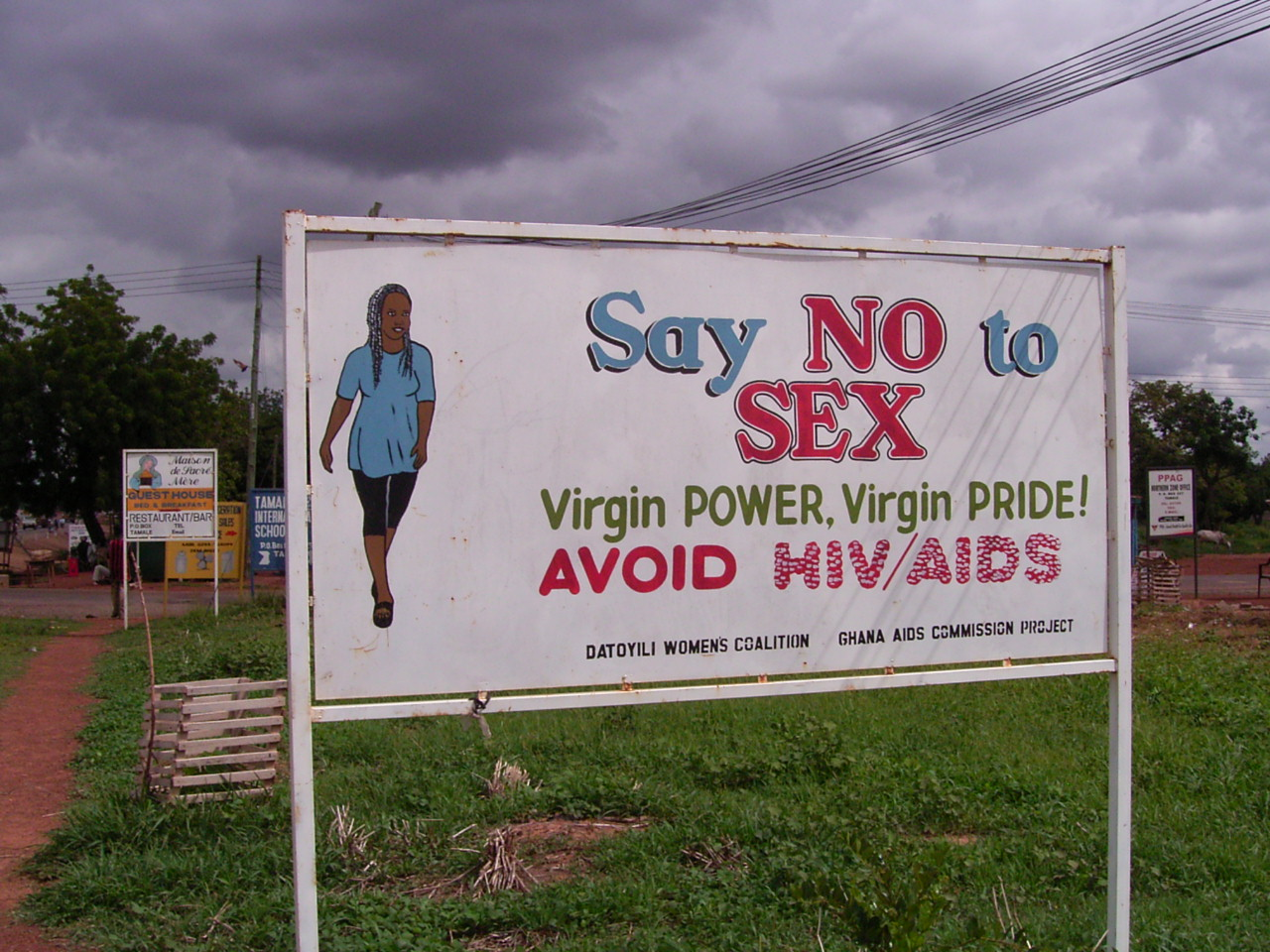
Sign to promote abstinence in Ghana as a way of preventing HIV/AIDS (2005)

A 2015 meta-analysis found that abstinence-focused programs had no effect on the likelihood of contracting STIs.

A Cochrane systematic review suggests that abstinence-only education neither increases nor decreases HIV risk in high-income countries. In the developing world there is a lack of evidence of effect. In 2008, Douglas Kirby reviewed the evidence for the effectiveness of abstinence-only education programs and found little evidence to justify the use of such programs. A 2011 meta-analysis found that it was ineffective at reducing the risk of HIV infection among adolescents. Abstinence education has also been found to include misleading medical information and exclude potentially life-saving information about sexual risk reduction. A 2016 study found "that state-level abstinence education mandates have no effect on teen birth rates or abortion rates, although we find that state-level policies may affect teen sexually transmitted disease rates in some states."

=== Pregnancy ===
Evidence does not support abstinence-only-until-marriage sex education. Research in the United States has found that abstinence-only education is related to increases in teen pregnancy and teen birth rates. Comprehensive sexual education on the other hand leads to a reduction in teenage birthrates. The decline of teenage pregnancy rates during 1995–2002 were largely due to improved contraception, and the reduction in pregnancy risk among teenagers aged 18 or 19 is due to less unprotected sex.

A 2010 report by the Guttmacher Institute pointed out that pregnancy rates for teens 15–19 reversed their decline in 2006, near the peak of the Abstinence Only campaign in the United States.

While sex education has been linked to a delay in the first time having sex, abstinence-only programs specifically have not shown this link, and do not seem to influence if or when young people begin having sex.

== Society and culture ==
=== Support ===
Proponents of abstinence-only sex education argue that this approach is superior to comprehensive sex education because it emphasizes the teaching of morality that limits sex to that within the bounds of marriage, and that sex before marriage and at a young age has heavy physical and emotional costs. In addition, abstinence programs often teach young people that pleasure in sex is most likely to be found within marriage, and therefore, that they should wait to engage in sexual activity until they are married. Abstinence generally places a great emphasis on the importance of the institution of marriage, which some proponents believe allows young people to grow and develop as individuals.

Proponents suggest that comprehensive sex education encourages premarital sexual activity among teenagers, which should be discouraged in an era when HIV and other incurable STIs are widespread and when teen pregnancy is an ongoing concern. According to the Guttmacher Institute, the AFLA, or Adolescent Family Life Act, was a five year-program with costs estimated around $250 million. Many supporters of abstinence-only education do so out of the belief that comprehensive guides to sex or information about contraceptives will ultimately result in teens actively pursuing and engaging in sexual activities, while others oppose the endorsement of contraception for religious reasons. Adults may view teenagers as less intelligent and less responsible, and unable to control themselves due to their hormones. As a result, a teenager's sexual desire is something that needs to be controlled, dividing the teens into two separate categories in the minds of adults: "the innocent and the guilty, the vulnerable and the predatory, the pure and the corrupting."

=== Opposition ===
Opponents and critics, which include prominent professional associations in the fields of medicine, public health, adolescent health, and psychology, argue that such programs fail to provide adequate information to protect the health of adolescents. Not only is information inadequate, but opponents believe that young people have the right to receive comprehensive information about how to protect themselves and their sexual health. Accurate information is especially important since, although some supporters may claim that abstinence is an effective method, it has been found that a small percentage of people actually practice it.

Some critics also argue that such programs verge on religious interference in secular education. Opponents of abstinence-only education dispute the claim that comprehensive sex education encourages teens to have premarital sex. The idea that sexual intercourse should only occur within marriage also has serious implications for people for whom marriage is not valued or desired, or is unavailable as an option, particularly LGBT people living in places where same-sex marriage is not legal or socially acceptable. Abstinence-only education is often criticized for being overly heteronormative, idealizing the institution of heterosexual marriage to the denigration of queer relationships. In addition, the heteronormativity of abstinence-only education, as well as the focus on marriage, means that members of the LGBT community will never receive formal information about how to practice safe sex, which is problematic, since they are already at an increased risk for STIs.

According to Advocates for Youth, abstinence-only sex education distorts information about contraceptives, including only revealing failure rates associated with their use, and ignoring discussion of their benefits. The language surrounding medicine and health is construed as being both objective and value free. This objectivity is then adopted by conservative politicians and campaigners to assert authority which historically holds its basis in religion.

Abstinence-only education is not supported by the majority of public school teachers, parents, and students. The majority in each of these groups is opposed to abstinence-only curriculum and wants a more comprehensive curriculum. "Although more than nine in 10 teachers believe that students should be taught about contraception... one in four are instructed not to teach the subject." Even when there are no rules limiting sex education to abstinence-only, teachers may continue to teach abstinence-only curriculum because they fear retaliation from the local community. Parents also want their children to be taught about contraception. "Most parents (65%) believe that sex education should encourage young people to delay sexual activity but also prepare them to use birth control and practice safe sex once they do become sexually active." 86% of parents want schools to teach their children how to get STD testing, 77% want their children to learn how to talk to a partner about STDs and birth control, 71% want them to learn how to use condoms, and 68% want them to learn about using other forms of birth control. Students are also opposed to abstinence-only education. "Approximately half of students in grades 7-12 report needing more information about what to do in the event of rape or sexual assault, how to get tested for HIV and other STDs, and how to talk with a partner about birth control and STDs." Clearly, there is a disparity between the type of sex education curriculum teachers, parents, and students want and what government policy determines they receive.

=== Definition ===
Another problem for abstinence education is the definition of abstinence. Santelli (2006) states that there is no strict definition of abstinence within the US federal government guidelines for teaching abstinence-only sex education, using a mixture of non-specific phrases, like "postponing sex" or "never had vaginal sex", while also using moralistic terms or phrases like virgin, chaste, and "making a commitment". This has resulted in sexual activities that are not penile-vaginal, including manual sex, oral sex and anal sex, being considered outside of the scope of abstention from sex, which is termed technical virginity.

=== Global impact ===
The U.S. President's Emergency Plan for AIDS Relief (PEPFAR) is the U.S. government's initiative to combat HIV/AIDS globally. PEPFAR works with the governments of 22 countries worldwide to create sustainable programs to prevent HIV and improve the lives of those suffering. PEPFAR provides funding to other countries to help combat HIV/AIDS. It does so with certain guidelines and restrictions on the recipients. PEPFAR promotes an "ABC" approach – Abstain, Be faithful, and use Condoms. Funding recipients may give information about condoms to youth over 15 years old but cannot use the funding to provide condoms or promote usage. In countries receiving funds from PEPFAR, teens under the age of 15 are not allowed to receive information about condoms. The rationale behind this is to not encourage sexual activity despite evidence that condom use does not cause promiscuity. PEPFAR was founded in 2003 with the mandate that 33% of its funds provided for prevention be used for abstinence-only education. Since the reauthorization in 2008, this mandate was removed, with a shift toward directives to spend at least 50% on abstinence-only education. The role of partners has been an area of debate surrounding PEPFAR. In 2006, 23% of all the community partners were faith-based and debate exists over whether the U.S. should be allowing grants specifically written for faith-based organizations and prevention. A few countries that have received PEPFAR funding – specifically Mozambique and Rwanda – have expressed distaste for the U.S.' push for faith-based education and abstinence-only funding. Human rights groups have expressed concern that condom availability has decreased since PEPFAR's involvement in the global AIDS crisis.

The $1.3 billion that the U.S. government spent on programs to promote abstinence in sub-Saharan Africa had no meaningful impact.

=== Politics ===
The Christian Right, who initially stood against having school-based sex education programs, began supporting abstinence-only programs due to the focus on marriage. As a driving force behind the abstinence movement, they have focused on getting more funding for these programs and have also been successful in creating more awareness surrounding abstinence through their use of activism. To the New Right, the abstinence-only sex education movement was an opportunity and an avenue to change the current view and status of sexuality in America, aligning it more with their own values, and as a result, creating individuals who remained abstinent until marriage, and thus, citizens who embodied values of self-discipline and morality. In addition, abstinence-only programs utilize ideas of individualism and personal responsibility when educating young people about sex, seeking to create individuals who take responsibility for sexuality and morality. These ideas underlie the basis of conservative ideology, a focus on the individual having a strong place in the beliefs of this group. Thus, it makes sense that support for abstinence-only programs as an effective form of sex education has been linked to conservative individuals.

=== Religion ===
Religious doctrines take varying stances on contraception and premarital sex; see:

- Religion and birth control
- Christian views on contraception
- Protestant views on birth control
- Catholic teachings on sexual morality
- Sexuality and Mormonism
- Fornication
- Premarital sex in Islam
- Buddhism and sexuality
- Hinduism and sex
- Kacchera (Sikhism)
- Judaism and sexuality
- Zoroastrianism and sexual orientation

The philosophical sex-positive movement cuts across many religions and rejects the idea that consensual premarital sex or contraception are immoral.

== See also ==
- Age of consent
- Sex education in the United States
- Comprehensive sex education
- Sexual norm
- Virginity pledge
- Abstinence-only sex education in Uganda
- Abstinence, be faithful, use a condom
