= Born in Africa (compilation album) =

Compilation album by Various artists
- Released: 1987
- Recorded: 1987
- Genre: World music
- Length: 6:55
- Producer: Philly Lutaaya

Born in Africa is an album produced by Philly Lutaaya and other Ugandan exiles in Sweden. The songs on the album remain ubiquitous in Uganda, and the musicians remain among the best-known Ugandan musicians.

In the last days of his life, Lutaaya, suffering from AIDS, produced an autobiographical documentary of the same title.
