= Abstinence-only sex education in Uganda =

Uganda is one of the few Sub-Saharan African countries that has adopted abstinence-only sex education as an approach of sexual education that emphasizes abstinence from sexual intercourse until marriage as the only option. Abstinence-only sex education does not include joint curriculum covering other options including safe sex practices, family planning, and is espoused as the only sure way to avoid pregnancy and sexually transmitted infections. Uganda is commonly recognized as an exemplary case of lowering the rate of HIV prevalence. Prevalence figures may have also been distorted by the lack of treatment, meaning that the percentage of infected is decreased by disproportionately early deaths. Abstinence-only sex education has been implemented and supported for this cause to a large degree in Uganda, to some controversy. Critics have questioned its effectiveness in lowering HIV/AIDS transmission. They have also highlighted discrimination, gender inequality and social stigma as the outcomes of the program in Uganda.

== Origins ==
In the wake of an increase of HIV prevalence in Uganda since it first appeared in 1982, many programs were introduced to lower incidence of HIV and educate about the disease. Abstinence-only sex education was implemented as one way to quell the spread of HIV/AIDS, in addition to creating a positive behaviour change to the same end over time. As the epidemic became known on the international scene, money and resources from many nations flooded Africa in general and Uganda in particular. Abstinence-only sex education in Uganda in the late 1990s onward was largely financed by the United States and independent faith-based organizations

== Programs ==
=== Abstinence, Be faithful, use a Condom (ABC) ===
The ABC approach was introduced during the US-Ugandan efforts to propose Abstinence-only as a way to lower HIV transmission. ABC is an acronym, A being Abstinence, B being Be Faithful, and C being Condom use. It would seem that this form of abstinence-only includes some education and encouragement of condoms, but the application of ABC is disaggregated for specific populations. The breakdown is Abstinence for people not yet married, Be Faithful for those in marriages, and Condom Use only for people that are already infected or are in a marriage where one person is infected.

ABC has evolved since its inception to a program known as AB, released in 2004 as an official abstinence-only education program for Uganda specifically. AB has lessened the emphasis on condoms due to the confusing nature of teaching the two simultaneously and the fear that condoms undermine the message of abstinence. AB is criticized for its lack of follow-through of collecting data on whether participants are abstaining or not. The main source of data collected for AB is the number of AB rallies, organizations and discussions concerning AB, instead of the behavioural changes proposed by AB. Therefore, AB is difficult to monitor as the true success of the programs aims for abstinence and social modifications, but no data is kept.

=== Condoms, Needles, and Negotiation (CNN) ===
Condoms, Needles and Negotiations was born out of the necessity of failing marital monogamy. CNN stands for Condoms, Needles and Negotiation. In sub-Saharan Africa, Uganda included, married women in monogamous relationships are at a disadvantage due to the lack of rights within marriage, bargaining power, and domestic violence. The need was discovered as most new HIV cases come from HIV women contracting the disease in their marriage through their husbands. In this way, AB abstinence-only education falls short for protecting the lives of those practicing it. The Condoms part of CNN is two-fold to reduce condom stigma and promote use within the B (Be Faithful) section of AB. Women are still practicing faithfulness, but in order to protect their health, they still need to be able to understand and use condoms. The first N in CNN covers needle exchange, which doesn't relate to abstinence-only sex education. But the second N stands for Negotiation, which again plays a part for individuals practicing faithfulness who could still be harmed. Negotiation informs partners of the risks they might encounter if their partner is not being monogamous and teaches them skills to bargain in their position in the relationship.

=== Presidential Initiative on AIDS Strategy for Communication to Youth (PIASCY) ===
In 2001, Ugandan President Yoweri Museveni introduced his official program for sex education for the youth of Uganda, Presidential Initiative on AIDS Strategy for Communication to Youth, abbreviated as PIASCY. PIASCY mainly targets primary schools, secondary schools and after school youth rallies with materials and instruction (HRW, 29). The main focus of PIASCY is for young people to empower themselves to delay their sexual relations until marriage through abstinence. PIASCY is primarily funded through the United States Agency for International Development and the U.S. Centers for Disease Control and Prevention, both of which provide many other services outside of finances to support the program. In addition, PIASCY has since become a foundation feature in the United States’ President's Emergency Plan for AIDS relief (PEPFAR).

==== Primary schools ====
The medium for primary school involvement with PIASCY is a combination of manuals, instruction for teachers to relay to students, as well as materials given directly to the students based upon their age/grade. An assembly is normally held twice a month school wide for teachers to give presentations outlined from the curriculum within the PIASCY manuals. The first message is the choice of abstinence and its benefits, but subsequent lessons can include teachings of self-esteem and how to be above peer-pressure. Although other parts of PIASCY include correct condom application and uses, at the primary level, abstinence-only is the majority of the message.

==== Secondary schools ====
In 2004, the Ugandan government incorporated PIASCY in secondary schools, in the form of handouts for students as well as teachers. The curriculum is disseminated in the classroom format on a regular basis. The secondary school level information was drafted to include age sensitive subjects such as masturbation, abortion and homosexuality, but was met with strong opposition from many powerful, yet undisclosed, groups in Uganda and the United States. In addition, draft copies of the secondary school handouts contained misleading and inaccurate information about condoms and HIV prevention. Furthermore, condoms were encouraged after marriage as HIV prevention, but did not explain how this differed with unmarried youth. The final drafts did include rudimentary instruction on condoms without the corresponding photos.

==== Out-of-school programs ====
PIASCY also has a significant section of their focus targeting youth that are not in school by holding rallies and events after school or outside of school. In Uganda, there are significant numbers of youth that are not enrolled in school, despite the recent movements to educate everyone. Although these events are generally held on a school campus or facility, anyone aged 15–30, student or not can participate. These events generally have speakers who are as diverse as the President of Uganda to religious leaders. In more rural areas, these serve to disseminate important abstinence messages but have been criticized as supporting an agenda of re-election and political messages and including inaccurate information about condoms and abstinence. After the formal rallies and programs, it is made aware that political leaders are around to take questions that youth may have about the current government. PEPFAR, an organization providing funding to PIASCY, outlines promotion of information, prevention and treatment of HIV, and is in contradiction with the political agenda and misleading information sometimes found in the PIASCY after school programs.

=== Faith-based organizations ===
In Uganda, there are a number of faith-based organizations that provide abstinence-only education to youth. Many of these are financed and supported by not only the Ugandan Government, but also the United States. In general, these are based on Christian beliefs, as 60% of Ugandans are Christian.

==== National (Uganda) Youth Forum ====
The National Youth Forum was founded by one of the nation's largest activists for abstinence-only sex education, first lady Janet Museveni. The primary objective for the National Youth Forum (NYF) is to coordinate assemblies where young boys and girls pledge to stay sexually pure until marriage. More than 70,000 Ugandan youths have committed to this through NYF. NYF and Museveni advocate abstinence-only education in its most exclusive form, even pushing the notion that condoms are inadequate in preventing HIV and education involving them promote sexual activity among youth. She has gone so far as to propose a nationwide testing of young boys and girls for virginity, although this has not come to pass. Ms. Museveni's organization NYF also obtains funding from the American government. This relationship has been called under scrutiny on the grounds that UNF Proselytizing and the laws of the United States regarding the secular nature of congressional funding.

==== Makerere Community Church ====
The Makerere Community Church is another national leader in the abstinence-only push. Martin Ssempa, who is one of the writers of the Ugandan AB policy, directs the church and foundation. Ssempa leads the fundamentalist Makerere Christian Church and his policies fall in line. He takes a more extreme version of abstinence only sex education, sometimes speaking out directly against condoms and women's rights. His is a more outlying approach to abstinence-only and the lifestyle that he connects with it.

==== Family Life Network ====
The Family Life Network is a non-profit organization that teaches abstinence-only techniques alongside value based sexual education. Since 2002, they have reached at least 130,000 students in over 400 schools. A tactic readily put into place is to create abstinence-only in the public discussion is a signing of "True Love Waits" cards to pledge abstinence until marriage. Stephen Langa, the executive director, defines the Family Life Network as having four goals: bring back faith in the marriage institution; show the danger of sexual involvement; warn children on the dangers of globalization, such as pornography; and ask children to make a commitment of abstinence. Although Langa does not actively speak out against condom use, his beliefs when questioned contain false information about the protection provided by condoms against sperm and HIV transference. The Family Life Network receives money from foreign and Ugandan donors, but has not in the past received any contributions from the United States or PEPFAR.

== Effectiveness ==
Looking at the effectiveness of abstinence-only sex education, it can't be measured in the knowledge received from the education, but instead the translation to the decisions that stem from the education. Three of these are STI/HIV prevention, the levels of teenagers participating in sexual activity and unplanned pregnancies.

In terms of lowering new infection rates of STIs and HIV in particular, there is a mixed opinion on the influence of abstinence only. Edward C. Green, frequently consults for USAID has been published remarking that abstinence-only was the main proponent of the lowering of HIV/AIDS infection in Uganda and that condoms were not effective. Furthermore, AIDS specialist Sophie Wacasa-Monacco explains that abstinence has played a very important role in the HIV decline, but only in conjunction with comprehensive education. It is the knowledge about HIV and STIs in general that allow for people to make educated decisions concerning their body and that of a prospective sexual partner. Abstinence is a good outlet to avoid sexual behaviour and therefore sexually transmitted infections, but without the full scope of the situation regarding sexual decisions, the consequences can be unclear and misleading.

Abstinence-only sex education encourages youth to delay their sexual début until marriage. Between the years of 1989 and 1995, Uganda saw large success with the employment of abstinence and subsequent HIV infection rates comparatively to their regional neighbours. In males aged 15–24 years old, there was a decrease from 60% to 23% participation in premarital sex. Similarly, females aged 15–25 saw a decrease from 53% to 16% in 1989 and 1995 respectively. This decrease coincided with a policy called zero-grazing, which emphasizes monogamous relationships and the faithfulness that is implied. Curiously, there were very few abstinence-only education programs in place during this decrease, despite the choice of abstinence from sexual intercourse having a significant decline.

Abstinence-only sex education leaves women socially vulnerable. Women in Uganda have a diminished ability to hold dominion over their bodies. Young women are often coerced into relationships with older men, teachers, or "sugar daddies" that provide them with items that would not be accessible otherwise. Biologically speaking, if women or men break their abstinence vow, a woman is twice as likely to contract HIV due to her anatomy. Furthermore, abstinence only sex education doesn't teach ways to avoid HIV/AIDS infection after marriage.

In Uganda, married women are one of the highest at risk populations. One of the biggest concerns is extra-marital sex that brings HIV into a seronegative relationship, in fact, in Uganda, men are twice as likely to infect their wives in marriage after entering into the relationship as seronegative. In addition, men are less likely to communicate the fact that they are infected with HIV to their partners. For example, of men that are hospitalized for HIV/AIDS, only 12% of the wives knew of their husbands' infection. When seronegative women engage in sexual intercourse with seropositive men, they are twice as likely to contract HIV than men in the same situation. In this respect, abstinence-only sex education neglects protecting anyone that does participate in sexual acts, and especially women, due to the gender power relations in Uganda.

In abstinence-only sex education, there is not a program within to plan for pregnancy or control birth spacing. As the only tenant is to abstain from sexual relations until marriage, once in marriage this feature is not utilized. In Uganda, there are strict tradition surrounding sex post-partum and while breastfeeding. Postpartum abstinence is a widely held belief and generally practiced. Unfortunately, this often leads to extramarital intercourse. In monogamous relationships, 31% of husbands abstain completely. This remaining 69% look elsewhere for sex, through polygamous relations, sex workers, or casual relationships. This abstinent period is not effective in the realm of preventing HIV from entering a seronegative relationship. In addition, in relationships that don't observe the post-partum abstinence, birth spacing becomes non-existent. In this case, many women find themselves pregnant in quick succession.

== Controversy ==
Abstinence-only sex education became quite controversial in the examination of HIV/AIDS and pregnancy prevention due to the common link with morals and proselytizing. Often, abstinence-only sex education is taught from a Christian perspective and creates a connection with virginity and self-worth. In many cases, if someone slips from abstaining, they will then view their self-worth as less as they no longer have their virginity, leading to risky sexual behaviour. Many countries have pulled support for any abstinence-only education due to concerns with the idea of HIV prevention information being coupled with missionary work and message.

Support has also been retracted when abstinence-only sex education was discovered to have been distributing false information regarding condom use and effectiveness. Abstinence-only sex education in Uganda has reportedly distributed the misinformation that there are tiny pores in condoms that allow the HIV virus to pass through, therefore deeming them unsafe to use against infection. It has also been disseminated that condoms are not effective birth control and the chance of getting pregnant is very high. This information that is easily disproven in the Global North, is difficult to combat in Uganda when it comes from political, spiritual and community leaders. This further stigmatizes condom use and lowers the likelihood that people engaging in sexual acts will use them. This misinformation is a large proponent against abstinence-only sex education as the organizations implementing the programs are unreliable or have proven to be in the past.

=== Socio-economic considerations ===
In many situations, the choice to abstain is non-existent. Many young girls and some boys are prostitutes, selling their bodies to survive. In these high-risk environments, the participants do not have the ability to abstain or enter into a faithful monogamous relationship. Abstinence-only sex education in Uganda has been criticized for ignoring the thousands of citizens that are forced into sexual relations and therefore unprotected against HIV/AIDS. Due to abstinence-only sex education teaching abstinence until marriage as the only option, many prostitutes do not know about or use condoms. This creates a breeding ground for HIV transmission. Abstinence-only sex education is woefully discriminatory against lower socioeconomic peoples.

Outside of prostitution, there exists young women and men that also cannot abstain due to social or financial pressure from older parties that act as "sugar mommies" and "sugar daddies". Young men and women engage in sexual relationships in order to obtain items, treats or opportunities that they would not be able to otherwise receive. Abstinence-only sex education in Uganda disregards the existence of these relationships and does not provide any program or policy to protect against HIV/AIDS infection.

=== Non-recognized unions ===
Another criticism levelled at abstinence-only sex education in Uganda is the limiting language and subsequent exclusion that the policy promotes when addressing lesbian, gay and bisexual (LGB) people. Abstinence-only sex education teaches to abstain from sex until marriage to a faithful partner. In Uganda, same-sex marriage is not recognized, and gay people can be penalized for coming out. In this way, some believe that abstinence-only sex education in Uganda discriminates against LGB individuals and does not provide them with adequate tools to combat HIV/AIDS infection.

=== Mutual exclusivity ===
Critics of abstinence-only sex education have made the point that abstinence-only truly curbs education and a well-rounded knowledge to fight HIV/AIDS infection. The implied mutual exclusivity of abstinence-only harms followers as they are not able to receive as much knowledge as possible. Leaders of the ABC method have highlighted the use of abstinence as a tool among others. The mutual exclusivity that so many abstinence-only teachers espouse does not need to exist. Abstinence can be an aspect of sex education without being the only curriculum in order to support an educated platform against HIV/AIDS infection in Uganda.

== See also ==
- Age of consent
- Sex education
- Comprehensive sex education
