= Traditional and Modern Health Practitioners Together against AIDS =

Non-government organization in Uganda

- Formation: 1992
- Type: Non-government organization
- Headquarters: Kampala, Uganda
- Website: www.thetauganda.org.ug

Traditional and Modern Health Practitioners Together against AIDS (THETA) is a non-government organization in Uganda that promotes collaboration between traditional healers and biomedical practitioners to prevent the spread of HIV/AIDS and provide care for HIV-positive patients. It was seen to be the first significant effort in Africa to involve traditional healers in the efforts against HIV/AIDS.

== Overview ==
THETA was established in 1992 by the National AIDS Control Programme, Uganda AIDS Commission, Médecins Sans Frontieres (Doctors Without Borders), and The AIDS Support Organization (TASO). It initiated two programs: 1) research effectiveness of traditional herbal medicine in treating AIDS symptoms and 2) research effectiveness of training traditional healers to be STI/AIDS educators and counsellors. By 1998, THETA had trained 125 healers in HIV/AIDS prevention over a five-year period, according to a UNAIDS evaluation. During an interview, Dr. Dorothy Balaba, former director and medical officer, explained:

"We want to enhance their capacity.... In fact, the healers bring their own skills to the table, and there is a lot that biomedical workers can learn from them. Conventional medicine is symptom oriented, but traditional healers' care is holistic in nature."

In February 2000 in Kampala, Uganda, THETA held a conference supported by UNAIDS and PROMETRA (Association of the Promotion of Traditional Medicine). It involved 100 delegates from 17 African countries, including Dr. Sandra Anderson of UNAIDS-South Africa, Dr. Donna Kabatesi (then THETA director), and Professor Charles Wambebe, the head of Nigeria's National Institute for Pharmaceutical Research and Development.During his tenure at NIPRD, he initiated and directed the research and development of Niprisan- a standardised phytomedicine for the prophylactic management of sickle cell disorder. It was a groundbreaking research that earned Wambebe The World Academy of Science Award in Medical Sciences (TWAS). Niprisan is generally regarded as clinically safe and effective. Wambebe holds five United States of America (USA) patents.

The goal of the conference was to acknowledge the widespread use of traditional medicine, review the role of traditional healers in HIV prevention and care, and support collaboration between traditional medicine and biomedicine.

This conference also led to the formation of an East and Southern African Regional Task Force on Traditional Medicine and HIV/AIDS in 2001. The task force involved 9 members from East and Southern African NGOs (Traditional Health Practitioners Association of Zambia and Zimbabwean National Traditional Healers Association), international organizations (UNAIDS, WHO/AFRO, Global Initiative for Traditional Systems), and observers from Ghana, Nigeria, and Cameroon.

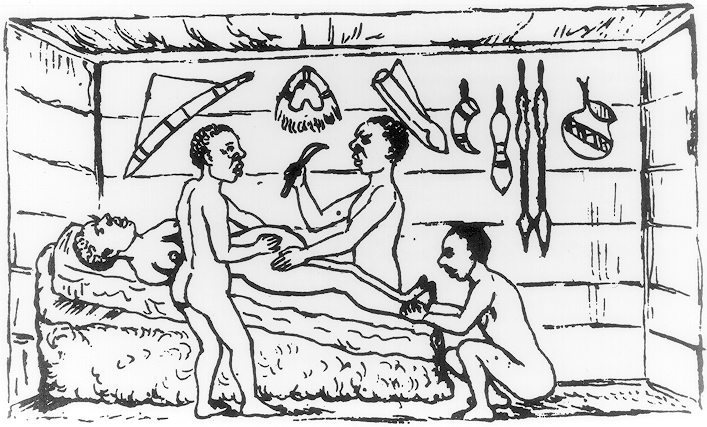
Traditional healers performing a successful Cesarean section as observed by R. W. Felkin in 1879 (present day Kahura, Uganda)

== Traditional medicine in Uganda ==
=== History ===
Before the Colonial Era, traditional medicine was the only health system in Uganda. During the Colonial Era from 1894 to 1962, traditional medicine was suppressed as it was negatively seen as "backwards" and "witchcraft", and the legitimacy of healthcare practice was placed on colonial biomedicine. Gradually, there have been attempts to provide support to traditional healers, legally recognize traditional medicine practice in Uganda, and move towards collaboration between the two practices. For example, since the early 1990s, the WHO has pushed for the inclusion of traditional medicine in national programs.

=== HIV/AIDS ===
The Ugandan AIDS Control Programme of 1989 by the Ministry of Health promoted decentralization of AIDS prevention and control from the national level to the district level in order to increase coverage and effectiveness. This highlighted community-based approaches involving biomedical health staff, NGOs, religious groups, local village leaders, local AIDS committees, and traditional healers.

For people who were HIV-positive, traditional healers provided a local, familiar, and accessible option compared to biomedical personnel who were usually overbooked and located farther away. In the early 1980s in southwestern Uganda, it was reported that many locals infected with the disease ("Slim") after showing symptoms of diarrhea and weight-loss would initially consult traditional healers due to their belief in the connection between the disease and witchcraft. In local communities, traditional healers were seen as having a respected and credible role in treating physical, psychological, and spiritual aspects of health, serving approximately 80% of people seeking health care. Despite their influence, biomedical practitioners often distrusted their credibility and traditional healers lacked adequate information about HIV/AIDS.
