= Fred Nalugoda =

Public health researcher

Fred Nalugoda is a public health researcher studying HIV/AIDS in rural Uganda for over 20 years, mainly through surveillance and field work. He currently serves as the Program Director of a research station in Kalisizo in Uganda as part of his continued work at the Rakai Health Sciences Program (RHSP).

== Education ==
Nalugoda holds a bachelor's degree in statistics, and later went on to receive a master's degree in health sciences from the Johns Hopkins Bloomberg School of Public Health, under the Fogarty AIDS International Training and Research Program. He has served as the Head of Grants, Science and Training at the RHSP while returning to Makerere University to pursue a doctorate degree in public health. In 2015, he graduated from Makerere University, in the school of Philosophy, studying public health, biostatistics, and epidemiology.

== Rakai Health Sciences Program ==
The Rakai Health Sciences Program represents a group of scientists, investigators and clinicians performing a number of studies while following trends in HIV infections among a large open cohort study from about 50 villages in the Rakai district of Uganda. The Rakai Community Cohort study acts as only one of the functions of the program, and a number of nested studies have drawn participants from this population. The cohort study is made up of about 12,00 individuals. The program also provides participants with treatment and counseling about HIV testing and other STI care. Fred Nalugoda has served in multiple roles in the program, conducting field study, training other scientists, and overseeing surveillance data. He is still currently employed with the RHSP and many of his publications have come from participants in the cohort study.

== Research interests ==
Fred Nalugoda, within the Rakai Community Cohort Study, was part of a foundational study investigating the effects of male circumcision on HIV incidence. Other publications centered around surveillance of HIV prevalence including treatment seeking behavior, vaccine coverage and willingness to participate in trials, and the effects of counseling on the number of people receiving HIV test results. Nalugoda himself asserts that his background and interest in biostatistics have allowed him to manage and publish data about the Rakai district. When describing the success in Rakai he said, "Now HIV treatment and prevention is widely available and denial is not a big issue now..". More recently, Nalugoda and the RHSP has studied other social issues which are highly correlated with HIV, namely intimate partner violence and gender empowerment programs.
