= The AIDS Support Organization =

- Formation: 1987
- Founder: Noerine Kaleeba
- Type: Non-governmental organization
- Purpose: Humanitarian
- Headquarters: Uganda
- Website: tasouganda.org

The AIDS Support Organization (TASO) is an indigenous HIV and AIDS service initiative, registered in Uganda as a non-governmental organisation. It is a pioneer non-public actor in the HIV and AIDS response in Uganda. TASO is a membership organisation with over 4,000 subscriber members.

== Overview ==
TASO was started in 1987 by a group of medical workers who had witnessed how badly patients showing signs of Acquired Immuno Deficiency Syndrome (AIDS) were being treated in the wards of the Mulago Hospital in Kampala. At first, it was a small, informal group of people meeting to talk about HIV and AIDS and grow into an organisation. It became one of the major HIV and AIDS care organisations in Uganda. When TASO started, Uganda was recovering from a war that brought the current government to power.

TASO was founded to provide comfort to patients who were being discriminated against and sometimes abandoned by relatives to die within the hospital compound. As the number of people coming for comfort to this small group grew, counseling became a necessary service to keep those seeking comfort. By 2008, TASO had grown into one of the largest indigenous HIV and AIDS services organisation in Uganda.

After Christopher Kaleeba, a radiographer, tested positive for HIV and suffered stigma and discrimination by his co-workers in Mulago Hospital, he suggested to his wife (Noerine Kaleeba) and her friends that a support group be formed to encourage those infected and affected by HIV and AIDS within the hospital.

A small group, composed of health workers and some patients, were allocated a room in the Polio Clinic at Mulago Hospital where they began offering clinical out-patient services run by Elly Katabira as an AIDS Clinic.

In 1989, TASO hosted Philly Lutaaya, a well-known musician, AIDS activist, and the first prominent person to put a human face to AIDS in Uganda. His song Alone was adopted as an anthem in TASO as well as many other AIDS groups in Uganda and many other countries. Following the example of Philly Lutaaya, clients who were gifted in music, dance and drama began performing in local communities to sensitize them on HIV and AIDS. The use of music, dance and drama was replicated in all the TASO Centers and became a major tool for crowd mobilisation and community sensitisation. At the end of 1993, TASO had expanded from one district to seven districts in Uganda.

== Partnerships ==
Together with another organisation called Traditional and modern Health practitioners Together Against AIDS (THETA), TASO pioneered collaboration with traditional healers in 1992 to give them basic counseling skills as well as knowledge about HIV infection.

From October 1999 until 2007, TASO partnered with the National Community of Women Living with HIV/AIDS to run the Child Survival Project. The project cost $1,000,000 and assisted 435 children to improve their literacy skills and to acquire the skills that are essential for survival. From October 2000 until 2007, TASO implemented the Vocational Apprenticeships for Vulnerable Children. It cost $926,355, with 832 children benefited through apprenticeship training.

From 2004 until 2006, TASO partnered with the National Agricultural Research Organisation of Uganda to implement the Partners for Food Security Project. Through this partnership, both organisations were able to address issues pertaining to food insecurity within households in rural Uganda, especially in the district of Tororo. TASO also has partnered with the uniformed forces.

TASO's Strategic Plan for 2013-2017 called for more funding (both local and international) for HIV related services in Uganda. TASO collaborated with the World Food Program to provide food to its clients. TASO also recognised that clients need a source of livelihood and, therefore, partnered with the Poultry Project to provide chicken to families as well as other animals such as pigs as income generating activities.

== Services ==
=== Medical ===
- Family planning
- Home care services
- HIV counseling
  - Home based HIV counseling and testing
  - Pre- and post-test counseling
- Capacity development
  - TASO's outreach clinics were phased out in 2011 after funding from USAID decreased.
  - In 2013, TASO rolled out services in the treatment and diagnosis of other opportunistic infections such as cervical cancer and tuberculosis. In the same year, TASO expanded its services to include male circumcision.
- Adolescent services
- Youth-friendly services
- HIV prevention
  - TASO has supported efforts to fight stigma among couples to increase use of HIV-related services in Uganda.
- Food and nutrition component
- Research
  - TASO has been involved in several community programmes as well as HIV-related clinical studies and drug trials.
  - TASO has partnered with the University of Ottawa on a study on microfinance, clinical trials, and the income of HIV+ clients in Africa.
- Research publications
  - Good Adherence to HAART and improved survival in a community HIV/AIDS treatment and care programme: the experience of The AIDS Support Organisation (TASO) Kampala, Uganda. Published 20 November 2008 by BMC Health Services Research 2008, 8:241. doi:10 1186/1472-6963/8/241. Abaasa M. Andrew et al.
  - Reliability of scored patient generated subjective global assessment for nutritional status among HIV infected adults in TASO, Kampala. Published 2011 by African Health Sciences 2011; 11(S1): S86 - S92.

== TASO Centers ==
TASO has established twelve centers across the country.

1. Mulago (established November 1987)
2. Masaka (established May 1988)
3. TASO Training Center (established October 1988)
4. Tororo (established November 1988)
5. Mbarara (established January 1989)
6. Mbale (established March 1990)
7. Jinja (established March 1991)
8. Entebbe (established November 1991)
9. Gulu (established January 2004)
10. Rukungiri (established August 2004)
11. Soroti (established August 2004)
12. Masindi (established August 2005)

== Projects ==
=== Active ===
- Grants Management Unit
- SCALAP - Karamoja

=== Ended ===
- TEACH - (Started in 2005, to support AIDS Service Organisations in Sub Saharan Africa to build their capacity in offering HIV related services.)
- SCOT
- REACH U
- PrEP
- SUSTAIN
- Nu-Hites
