= Zoroastrianism and homosexuality =

Homosexuality in the Zoroastrian religion

Zoroastrian views on homosexuality have traditionally been negative. Modern-day Zoroastrian communities hold a variety of views on the topic.

== Homosexuality in scripture ==
Within the Gathas, the sacred hymns attributed directly to Zarathushtra, there exists a singular reference which is considered to touch upon homosexuality. This reference appears in Yasna 51.12, a rhymed verse line. In this verse, the prophet strongly condemns a figure referred to as a "sorcerer poet" or 'vaēpiia'. This term has been translated by Nanavutty to mean 'sodomite' and by Humbach to mean 'passive sodomite'. The term "vaēpiia" bears significance, in the Vedic tradition, it denotes an inspired, frenzied poet, one whose emotions, feelings, and poetry resonate with a vibration, swinging rhythm, and frenzy. However, the same term is also associated with wanton sexual behavior. In all the other Avestan works, "vaæpyö" takes on a strictly derogatory connotation related to sexuality. The Südgar Nask commentary on the Gathas reinforces this condemnation of sodomy. This understanding of Yasna 51.12 is still prevalent amongst conservative Zoroastrians today. Zoroastrians associated with reformist movements tend to reject this interpretation, this includes Rohinton Nariman's translation and D.J. Irani's translation of the Gathas.

Traditionalist Zoroastrians believe that the Vendidad, one of the books of the Avesta, is an inherent part of Zoroastrian oral tradition even though it was compiled far later than the other parts of the Avesta.

The man that lies with mankind as man lies with womankind, or as woman lies with mankind, is a man that is a Daeva [demon]; this man is a worshipper of the Daevas, a male paramour of the Daevas

This passage has been interpreted to mean that homosexuality is a form of demon worship, and thus sinful. Commentary on this passage suggests that those engaging in sodomy could be killed without permission from the Dastur, the high priest.

Zoroastrianism has been said to have a "hatred of male anal intercourse" that is reflected in at least one mythological tale. When Ahriman, the "Spirit of Aridity and Death" and "Lord of Lies", sought to destroy the world, he engaged in self-sodomy. That caused an "explosion of evil power" and resulted in the birth of a host of evil minions.

Apart from the Vendidad, the Pahlavi scriptures, later religious Persian books considered sacred by many Zoroastrians, also strongly forbid sodomy.

== Societal attitudes of Zoroastrian communities ==
Within modern Zoroastrian communities, attitudes towards homosexuality can vary.

While some adherents, especially in Iran and India, hold conservative views that align with traditional interpretations, others have adopted liberal stances in diaspora communities, reflecting broader Western societal shifts.

In recent years, debates surrounding same-sex marriage have emerged within Zoroastrian communities, in regions such as India where the religion maintains a significant presence. Zoroastrian religious leaders have historically upheld socially conservative perspectives on marriage and sexuality, and as recently as 2023 they have publicly decried a religious validity for same-sex marriages.

In India, where Zoroastrians are governed by personal laws under the Parsi Marriage and Divorce Act of 1936, same-sex marriage remains unrecognized within the community. Religious leaders, such as Dasturji Dasturji Khurshed Dastoor, the high priest of Iranshah Atash Behram, Udvada have voiced opposition to efforts to legalize same-sex marriage among Parsis. Dastoor, the high priest of Iranshah Atash Behram, Udvada, expressed that Zoroastrian ancient texts do not mention same-sex marriages as they date back to a time when such unions were not recognized. The texts focus on marriage between a male and female. Dastoor acknowledges that legal judgments, including those from the Supreme Court, should be respected and followed and so if same-sex marriage becomes legalized, individuals will marry according to the law. However, Dastoor clarifies that ceremonies for same-sex couples would not be allowed to be conducted in Zoroastrian places of worship.
