= Joseph Konde-Lule =

Ugandan medical sociologist and epidemiologist

- Occupations: Social Epidemiologist, Associate Professor
- Years active: 1977-2014
- Employer: Makerere University
- Known for: HIV Behavioral Intervention Research in Rakai, Uganda
- Awards: Takemi Fellow (1990-1991), UCSF ITAPS Fellow (1990)

Joseph Konde-Lule is a retired Ugandan medical sociologist and epidemiologist who conducted extensive work regarding HIV risk behaviors in rural Uganda.

== Background ==
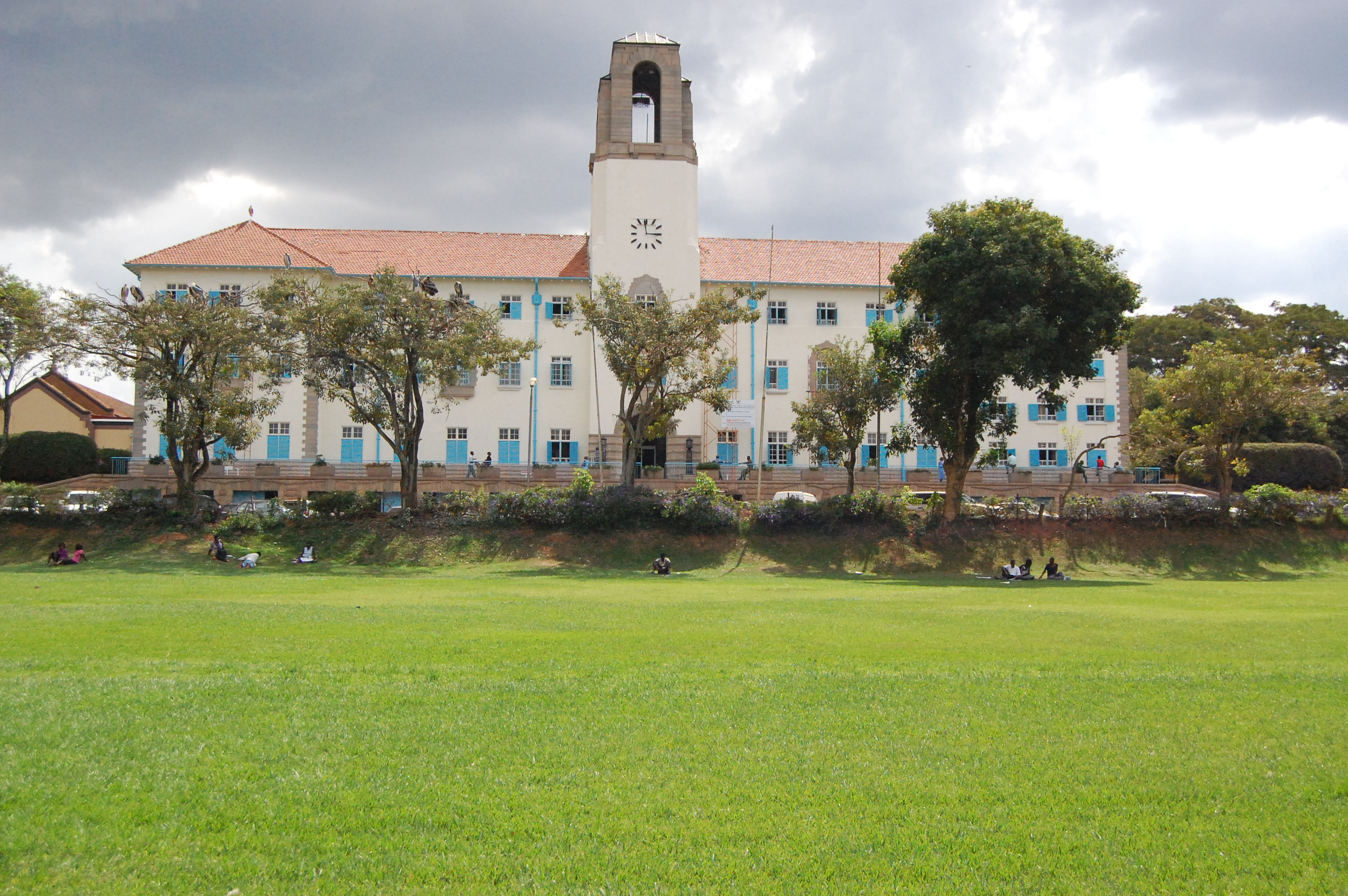
Makerere University

Joseph Konde-Lule holds degrees as a Bachelor of Medicine and Bachelor of Surgery as well as a Master of Public Health. He was an associate professor in the Department of Epidemiology & Biostatistics, now under the School of Public Health, at Makerere University in Uganda from 1977 until 2014. He additionally served as the first head of the department.

Throughout his career, Konde-Lule has amassed over seventy-two publications to his name, many of them focusing on understanding social determinants of HIV and its spread within Uganda. His career in public health research began with his thesis which focused on syphilis prevalence and how understanding of the virus, or lack thereof, was allowing it to continue to spread within communities. He later applied this research background to understanding HIV/AIDS prevalence when he began work in Kasangati, Uganda in 1987.

== Research in Rakai, rural Uganda ==
New HIV infections each year, and AIDS deaths occurring during the year in Uganda; data from UNAIDS AIDSinfo

It is generally accepted by epidemiologists that the decline of HIV prevalence in Uganda was largely due to efforts focused on changing behavior; HIV is a virus currently without a cure. Therefore, for prevalence to decline, populations of infected individuals must decline as well. Uganda created "one of the most extensive AIDS education programs in Africa" in part due to the targeted mitigation strategies crafted from the work conducted in Rakai starting in 1989.

The Rakai Project was a research initiative funded by both Columbia University and the Uganda Ministry of Health so as to better understand the disease and its spread. Based on the work conducted by this research initiative, it was discovered that three communities are predominantly at risk of contracting HIV in Uganda: those near trading centers, small villages by secondary roads, and rural agrarian villages. The effectiveness of Uganda's containment strategy involves the fact that HIV research was focused on ways to prevent further spread of HIV. Thus, with time and targeted research initiatives, fewer people contracted HIV and prevalence began to decline.

The location of Rakai within Uganda

The peak of Dr. Joseph Konde-Lule's work occurred in his work on the Rakai Project. Many of Dr. Joseph Konde-Lule's Rakai studies sought to determine populations of heightened risk of contracting HIV in Uganda. This was largely driven by the finding that many individuals in the Rakai district indicated substantial understanding of AIDS and prevention techniques, like the use of condoms, yet were still experiencing high rates of infection. In particular, studies found that those individuals in charge of the household were at high risk of contracting HIV, indicating the ways the disease could impact economics and social organization in a household. Additional risk factors included employment that required mobility and migration and involvement in the cash economy.

In addition to identifying these high risk groups, Konde-Lule's work in Rakai sought to understand the sexual networks of transmission. Of particular interest for future policy included the finding that girls had a significantly higher HIV infection rate than boys of the same age group seemingly due to the fact that girls were more likely to engage in sexual relationships with older men, a group with already heightened HIV rates compared to younger boys in the community. Additionally, married individuals were expressing higher prevalence of HIV than unmarried individuals, a finding that ran counter to previous speculation.

== Achievements ==
In 1990, Konde-Lule was recognized as a Takemi Fellow of the Harvard School of Public Health, an acknowledgement of the significant work he contributed to the improvement of public health in Uganda. In 1990, he also received a competitive ITAPS fellowship from University of California at San Francisco for his project "Assessment of the rate of progression of HIV infection in a Ugandan cohort during 5 years of follow-up."
