= Condoms, needles, and negotiation =

Condoms, needles, and negotiation, also known as the CNN approach, is a harm reduction approach to reducing the rate of transmission of sexually transmitted infections such as HIV/AIDS by:

- Providing condoms and teaching negotiation of safer sex with partners
- Providing clean needles to reduce transmission from injection drug use

In contrast with the abstinence, be faithful, use a condom, or "ABC" approach to this problem, the "CNN" approach aims primarily at reducing the rate of transmission among high-risk groups such as women in areas where women have low levels of social power, prostitutes and their clients, and intravenous drug users.

== Criticisms ==
Pope Benedict XVI has strongly criticized reduction policies with regards to HIV/AIDS, saying that "it is a tragedy that cannot be overcome by money alone, that cannot be overcome through the distribution of condoms, which even aggravates the problems". This position has been widely criticised for misrepresenting and oversimplifying the role of condoms in preventing infections. Other experts, including the Director of Harvard University's AIDS Prevention Research Project, have supported the Pope's position.

== See also ==
- HIV/AIDS in Brazil
