= Uganda AIDS Commission =

Public health authority in Uganda

The Uganda AIDS Commission (UAC) is a non-governmental organization (NGO) established by parliamentary statute in 1992. Its headquarters are currently located in the capital city Kampala, and it receives funding from both the parliament and outside donors. The Commission's main objective is to coordinate and monitor the implementation of the national strategy to combat HIV/AIDS, adopted by the Government of Uganda in 1990. It aims to transform Uganda into "A Population Free of HIV and its Effects" by strengthening governance and management systems, resource mobilization, advocacy and communication for the National HIV Response, and strategic information for evidence-based decision making. Although the UAC does not engage in direct implementations of interventions, it provides valuable oversight and coordination of all HIV/AIDS related activities in Uganda.

To effectively manage and coordinate its multi-sectoral stakeholders, the UAC established five key objectives: (1) offer strategic policy guidance to stakeholders addressing the HIV/AIDS crisis, (2) allocate and oversee resources for Uganda's national HIV/AIDS response, (3) strengthen partnerships and coordination efforts between stakeholders, (4) increase knowledge capacity about HIV/AIDS among the general population, and (5) improve institutional management to achieve an optimal combative strategy.

== Leadership ==
The Commission is situated under the Office of the President of Uganda, with permission granted from Article 99 (3) of the Constitution of the Republic of Uganda, which requires the President to safeguard citizen welfare. The current Board Chair is Canon Ruth Senyonyi, who succeeded Eddie Mukoyo in April 2024, and the Director General is Nelson Musoba.

Consisting of 11 members, the UAC Board serves as the supreme decision-making organ that provides policy guidelines and strategic direction to the Secretariat in implementation of its mandate. Alongside its full-time Chairperson, these members include individuals from both government and non-government sectors, those living with HIV, and others selected for their exceptional expertise.

== Pre-UAC Initiatives ==
In 1982, Uganda medical doctors first detected AIDS cases off the shores of Lake Victoria in the Rakai district in southern Uganda. At the time, Uganda was among the earliest countries impacted by HIV/AIDS and continues to be one of the hardest hit. During the World Health Assembly in Geneva four years later, Uganda's Health Minister publicly acknowledged the presence of HIV/AIDS in the country, which initiated political recognition about and legitimacy toward the epidemic. After another year had passed, the Government of Uganda established the National Committee for the Prevention of AIDS, followed by the AIDS Control Program in the Ministry of Health. The latter served as the first government-structured effort to actively address the HIV/AIDS epidemic.

In 1987, the Government of Uganda established the AIDS Support Organization to provide psychosocial support to those severely affected, and in 1990, they formed the AIDS Information Center to offer voluntary counseling and testing services. Two years later, the Government of Uganda recognized HIV/AIDS's importance beyond the health sector and adopted the Multi-Sectoral Approach to the Control of AIDS (MACA). This approach aimed to build powerful coalitions between the government and its multi-sectoral stakeholders, including community-based organizations and businesses, to best enact prevention efforts.

In part to fulfill MACA's mission, the Government of Uganda founded the Uganda AIDS Commission (UAC) in 1992 to coordinate national policy formulation, oversight functions, and advocacy efforts. Following this establishment, the government undertook additional means to mobilize and unify national responses to the epidemic, and these efforts developed the following: the National Operational Plan (1993-1997), twelve AIDS Control Programs in line ministries, and many District AIDS Coordination Committees.

== Notable Programs ==
In 1993, the UAC oversaw the creation of the first multi-sectoral National Operational Plan for HIV/AIDS prevention.

In 2002, it established the Uganda HIV/AIDS Partnership Mechanism (PM), which encouraged several constituencies working to combat the HIV/AIDS crisis to accept both the One National Strategic Plan and the One M&E Framework. Additionally, this mechanism encouraged these constituencies to recognize the UAC as the One National HIV/AIDS Coordinating Authority.

Closely related, the Partnership Forum is an event that occurs every two years, allowing stakeholders to undertake and oversee all operations of the PM. The Forum provides a platform for consultation, information exchange, collaborative planning, and review in alignment with the national AIDS response strategy.

In 2003, the UAC conducted a mid-term review of the 2000–2006 National Strategic Framework for HIV/AIDS and subsequently facilitated partner dialogues to enhance HIV communication strategies, with a particular focus on young people. Ultimately, it established the Young Empowered and Healthy (YEAH) campaign—a national and multi-sector multi-media campaign that brought together stakeholders, young people, and the media, with a particular emphasis on the radio serial drama Rock Point 256.

In June 2017, the President of Uganda, Yoweri Museveni, launched the Presidential Fast Track Initiative (PFTI), which aimed to end AIDS as a public health threat by 2030. Following this announcement, the UAC launched the Wear a Red Ribbon Campaign to promote testing, end the stigma, and raise awareness about the crisis. This campaign encouraged individuals to wear a red ribbon each day in unity and solidarity with those affected and infected by HIV/AIDS, particularly adolescent girls and young women.

Starting in 2021, the UAC has sponsored an annual National HIV and AIDS symposium, which (1) introduces new scientific innovations invented to combat the virus, (2) discusses the Annual Joint AIDS Review report among stakeholders, and (3) rallies Ugandans against HIV and AIDS-related stigma during the Philly Lutaaya Commemoration. During the inaugural symposium, the Commission's National HIV and AIDS Strategic Plan (NSP) implemented a National Priority Action Plan (NPAP) to provide guidance on prevention, care and treatment, social support and protection, and systems strengthening.

Since 2021, the Commission has also spearheaded international and national advocacy and awareness days. It has since observed five World AIDS Days, five Candlelight Memorial Days, and two Philly Lutaaya memorial lectures. In addition to these initiatives, the UAC has established the following: (1) a specific HIV/AIDS Committee in parliament to ensure that the HIV agenda is discussed in government legislature and (2) the HIV/AIDS mainstreaming guidelines, which were incorporated into the last two budget call circulars. These programs have been successfully introduced and implemented in over 60% of the districts in Uganda.

Around this time, the UAC reorganized the Country Coordination Mechanism (CCM) to oversee the mobilization and management of global funds allocated to both public and private sector principal recipients. Additionally, it led the One Dollar Initiative, another resource that encourages individuals and organizations to contribute at least a dollar per person to the HIV/AIDS prevention cause. In 2021, Parliamentarians alone raised almost 1 billion shillings in cash and pledges, indicating a positive public response.

Alongside this latter initiative, the UAC promoted the Yambala4me campaign in 2023, which increased awareness on personal safety. In particular, the campaign focused on encouraging the uses of condoms, seatbelts, face masks, and life jackets.

In collaboration with the Initiative for Better Health (IBH), a non-profit organization aiming to improve the health and economic security for young adults in Uganda, the UAC launched its inaugural Empuumo Marathon at Kakyeka Stadium in Mbarara City in 2024. This charity event mobilized the local community, raised stakeholder and population participation, and rallied resources and energies to help end HIV/AIDS by 2030. Alongside the race, the Empuumo Marathon event offered voluntary HIV testing and counseling services, safe male circumcision, information on HIV awareness and prevention, blood donations, and cultural performances.

In September 2024, the UAC launched its Action Plan for Cultural Institutions and Traditional Leadership Structures to coordinate HIV/AIDS prevention efforts until 2030. This initiative seeks to end AIDS as a public health threat in Uganda by 2030. This plan gathers the strengths, efforts, and resources of cultural institutions in the multi-sectoral HIV response to help tackle the socio-cultural factors driving the epidemic, while acknowledging that biomedical interventions alone are inadequate to prevent its spread.

== Legacy ==
Since 1992, the UAC has made sizable contributions to Uganda’s fight against HIV/AIDS. At that time, when a diagnosis meant a death sentence, nearly 18% of the population was HIV-positive. By 2024, the national HIV prevalence had fallen to 5.1%, with tremendous improvements made in the last couple decades. From 2010 to 2023, HIV infections declined by 61%, and AIDS-related deaths fell by 63%. The UAC's outreach efforts have spread comprehensive knowledge about HIV/AIDS prevention and promoted safer sexual activity among Ugandans. Between 2011 and 2022, knowledge among men and women have increased by 16% and 18%, respectively, and safe male circumcisions have increased by 6,000,000 since 2010.

Compared to international standards, the UAC has covered significant ground. It contributed to Africa Agenda 2063, which set out to ensure the health and well-nourishment of its citizens, as well as improve institutional capacity and bring about more transformative leadership. In 2013, the Commission achieved the Africa Agenda's established ten-year target to reduce HIV/AIDS infections by at least 80% and lower the proportion of deaths attributed to HIV by 50%. Additionally, the UAC has greatly contributed to East Africa Vision 2025, which aimed to achieve a 3.6% HIV prevalence rate among the populations by 2030.

In 2023, the UAC also made major improvements to its program management sectors, which have positively contributed to the organization's ambitions. In particular, it enhanced its laboratory capabilities for accurate testing and diagnosis, thereby improving the overall reliability of HIV testing across Uganda. Moreover, it increased financing and sustainability, where approximately $690.2 million was used to fund HIV/AIDS interventions, with the Ugandan government contributing 13% of this amount.

== Areas for Growth ==
Despite its successes, the UAC acknowledges room for improvement. In 2024, approximately 4,700 babies acquired HIV infections from their mothers, even with treatment readily available at health facilities across the country. Teenagers and youth suffer most from the virus, accounting for 70% of the 5,000 new infections registered across the country each week, according to data from 2024. Additionally, HIV prevalence is greatest among young women and girls, who suffer nearly four times as often as their male counterparts. With limited access to education, many mothers ignore safety measures and inadvertently pass on the virus to their children.

In 2024, the UAC came under brief fire, when the Resident District Commissioners from the Masaka sub-region, serving as Chairpersons of District HIV/AIDS Coordination Committees, criticized their current prevention measures. Chairperson Paddy Kayondo urged the UAC to better tailor its messaging toward younger generations, who are becoming increasingly nonchalant about infection risks. Kayondo encouraged the UAC to adopt an earlier approach, whose educational strategy revolved around the use of school plays, entertainment skits, and vigorous social media use to increase awareness.

Additionally, levels of stigma both in the community and institutional settings remain high at 24% external and 35% internal. This ongoing stigma contributed to low HIV testing, status disclosure, and compliance with antiretroviral therapy utilization in Uganda.

== Some Media Highlights ==
February 12, 2025: "U.S. Funding Withdrawal Threatens Uganda’s Progress in HIV/AIDS Fight - AIDS Commission."

February 7, 2025: "The Uganda AIDS Commission (UAC) has urged the Parliament’s Committee on HIV/AIDS to advocate for the Government to allocate 300 billion shillings in response to the growing HIV crisis, following the freeze on foreign aid and grant funding initiated by the administration of the United States President Donald Trump."

January 31, 2025: "Uganda AIDS Commission Assures HIV Patients Of Access To ARVs After Trump’s Executive Order."

December 22, 2024: "Safeguarding Ourselves During the Festive Season: A Message on HIV Prevention from the Uganda AIDS Commission."

November 6, 2024: "The Uganda AIDS Commission has been asked to consider refocusing the available HIV prevention messages as a strategic method to re-energize the fight to eliminate the virus by 2030."

August 28, 2024: "The Uganda AIDS Commission bosses are dismayed by the increasing number of people, especially men, who die of HIV/AIDS in the country due to negligence."

August 18, 2024: "Uganda is grappling with significant challenges in its fight against HIV, particularly among key populations."

July 13, 2024: "Dr. Stephen Watiti has been sworn in as a member of the 10th board of Uganda AIDS Commission (UAC)."

April 10, 2024: "The new Uganda AIDS Commission (UAC) chairperson, Dr. Ruth Senyonyi, yesterday assumed office pledging to renew efforts to combat Aids as a public health threat by 2030."

October 29, 2023: "The Uganda AIDS Commission is on the cusp of a significant milestone in the battle against HIV as it eagerly awaits clearance from the National Drug Authority (NDA) to commence the importation of a groundbreaking HIV injection."

January 13, 2022: "The UAC wants government to shoulder at least half of the financial burden in a bid to reduce donor dependence."

November 19, 2019: "A leading charity, Marie Stopes, says it has recalled more than a million condoms distributed in Uganda following concerns about their safe use."

== See also ==
- HIV/AIDS
- Millennium goals
