= Uganda AIDS Orphan Children Foundation =

- Abbreviation: UAOCF
- Formation: 2003
- Type: Non-Profit Organization 501(c)(3)
- Headquarters: Los Angeles
- Region served: Uganda
- Budget: $140,000 USD+
- Staff: 20
- Website: www.uaocf.org

The Uganda AIDS Orphan Children Foundation (UAOCF) is a non-profit charity that helps vulnerable children and those orphaned by AIDS in Uganda. UAOCF received 501 (c) (3) charity status in 2003; subsequently, the Internal Revenue Service granted permanent public charity status in 2006. The foundation's mission is to provide support to orphans in foster homes and to support Hope House, the Kabale Diocese residential facility/technical school for orphans. As of April 2009, UAOCF supports over 50 children at Hope House and over 350 all together.

Based in Los Angeles, California and with operations in four Ugandan districts: Kabale, Rukungiri, Kisoro and Kanungu, UAOCF was formed in 2004 in response to the far-reaching repercussions of the AIDS epidemic. The Sub-Saharan African nation has more than 2.3 million children orphaned due to AIDS-related deaths. With a total population of more than 30 million, Uganda has the highest proportion of AIDS orphans of any country in the world. The organization is dedicated to draw attention to the plight of these orphans.

== History ==
Uganda has been greatly impacted by the devastation of HIV/AIDS. Recent statistics from the World Health Organization show that AIDS has left a long-lasting effect on Uganda’s population, most notably children and families. As a result, AIDS has caused over 2 million children of Uganda to have been orphaned since the epidemic began – losing one or both parents to AIDS.

== Proceeds ==
Uganda AIDS Orphan Children Foundation provides care, support and education through the following targeted programs:

- Foster Home Children / Adopt-An-Orphan – Provides care, support and education through High School for AIDS-orphaned children in foster homes.
- Special Education Support Fund – Supports post-secondary school education for gifted children graduating from the Foster Home Care Program.
- Hope House Orphanage / Vocational School – Hope House is a residential and technical school for children who have no one to support them.
- Hope House Development Fund – Provides for expansion of “Hope House” residential and vocational training facilities according to its master plan.
- Orphan’s Extraordinary Medical Care Fund – Provides additional support to children who require out-of-the-ordinary medical care, especially those who have AIDS.
- UAOCF General Support Fund – 100% of the money donated to the Orphan Support Funds and Hope House Funds go directly to the needs of children; the General Support Fund provides for administrative expenses in Los Angeles and Uganda.

== Goals ==
The UAOCF aims to provide assistance to orphaned and vulnerable children in rural southwestern Uganda by:

- Supporting a home for orphaned and vulnerable children
  - The project Hope House seeks to initially house and train 20 students (ages 13 to 17), with plans to increase this number annually. This long-term commitment eventually will house 65 children and will include a polytechnic institution to prepare the children to provide for themselves.
- Supporting orphans and vulnerable children in individual foster homes
  - We have met out initial goal to support 200 children (ages 4 to 17) from the four districts in the Kabale diocese, and we plan to increase the number of children by at least 50 each year.
