= Philly Lutaaya =

Ugandan musician (1951–1989)

Philly Bongoley Lutaaya
- Philly during a stage performance
- Born: 19 October 1951; Gomba, Uganda
- Died: 15 December 1989 (aged 38)
- Cause of death: HIV/AIDS
- Citizenship: Swedish, Ugandan
- Known for: HIV/AIDS activism

cleared

Philly Bongoley Lutaaya (19 October 1951 – 15 December 1989) was a Ugandan musician who was the first prominent Ugandan to give a human face to HIV/AIDS. He became a national hero because he was the first Ugandan to declare that he was HIV–positive. That was in 1988, when HIV still carried a lot of stigma. Before dying of AIDS, Lutaaya spent his remaining time writing songs about his battle with AIDS, releasing his last album Alone and Frightened, including his famous song "Alone", influenced by Swedish duo Roxette's hit song It Must Have Been Love as well as touring churches and schools throughout Uganda to spread a message of prevention and hope. Lutaaya was popular in Uganda in the 1960s, and in the 1970s he toured the Democratic Republic of the Congo, Kenya, and Japan. In the mid-1980s, he settled in Stockholm, Sweden. There he recorded his hit album Born in Africa, which is still popular in Uganda. Philly could play the guitar, piano (keyboards), and drums.

Lutaaya's Christmas Album, produced in 1986, remains his most popular album to date. The album, whose songs were written in native Luganda, remains central to Christmas celebrations in Uganda. It includes classics such as "Merry Christmas, Zuukuka, Tumusinze, Ssekukkulu, Gloria, Anindiridde, and Katujaguze. To date, Philly Lutaaya remains one of the best recording musicians Uganda has ever produced.

Lutaaya's music incorporates western pop music style as observed in songs like "Anifa sembera, Gloria, I have a dream, the voice is crying out, sirimba, sekukkulu to mention."

== Personal life ==
Lutaaya was married to Annet Nantume and they had three children namely, Tezra Nakiganda Lutaaya, Jastin and lennon.

== Awards ==
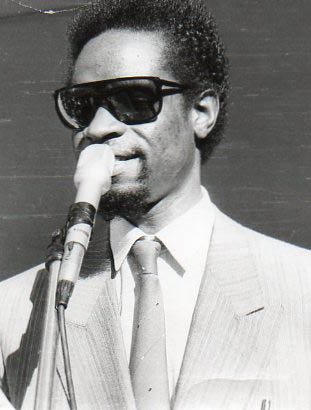
Philly Lutaaya

In 2004, he won Lifetime Achievement Award at the Pearl of Africa Music Awards (PAM Awards)

Later in 2007, various Ugandan artists came together to re-record some of Lutaya's greatest hits. Bebe Cool sang "Born in Africa", Juliana Kanyomozi re-did "Diana". Iryn Namubiru and Nubian Li of Fire Base Crew both re-did "Empisazo".

== Legacy ==
Philly Lutaaya

After his death at age 38, the Philly Lutaaya Initiative Association was created by a group of infected and affected peers at that time to help educate people about the dangers of HIV/AIDS. With assistance from UNICEF, the initiative sponsors lectures in schools and communities across Uganda highlighting personal testimonials of hundreds of people infected with HIV. In Uganda, 17 October is the Philly Bongoley Lutaaya Day observed by the Uganda Aids Commission. 2014 daughter Tezra Lutaaya started a community-based organisation to keep her father's legacy alive. The organisation will help boost the socio-economic lives of AIDS orphans and widows through a Philly Lutaaya Vocational Centre in Kanoni, Gomba. This is the birthplace of Philly Lutaaya.

A biopic about Philly's life is in development by filmmaker Usama Mukwaya.

== Discography ==
=== Albums ===
- Merry Christmas (1987, remastered and re-released 11 December 2015)
- Alone (1988, remastered and re-released 11 December 2015)
- Alone II The legacy (1988, remastered and re-released 11 December 2015)
- Tumusinze (1988, remastered and re-released 11 December 2015)
- Born in Africa (1986, remastered and re-released 11 December 2015)

== See also ==
- HIV/AIDS in Uganda
- Jimmy Katumba
