= Kokoro (disambiguation) =

Kokoro is a 1914 novel by Natsume Sōseki.

Kokoro may also refer to:

== People with the given name ==
- Kokoro Frost (born 2002), Samoan New Zealander swimmer
- Kokoro Fujii (藤井 快; born 1992), Japanese professional sport climber and boulderer
- Kokoro Kageura (影浦 心; born 1992), Japanese judoka
- Kokoro Kikuchi (菊池 こころ; born 1982), Japanese voice actress
- Kokoro Saegusa (三枝 こころ; born 1987), Japanese fashion model
- Kokoro Terada (寺田 心; born 2008), Japanese child actor

== Fictional characters ==
- Kokoro (Dead or Alive) (心), a character in the video game series Dead or Alive
- Kokoro (ココロ), a character in the manga series One Piece
- Kokoro Fuyukawa (冬川 心), one of the main characters of the visual novel Remember 11: The Age of Infinity
- Kokoro Katsura (桂 心), a character in the visual novel School Days
- Kokoro Aichi (愛知 心), one of the main characters of the webcomic Sleepless Domain
- Kokoro Misaki (岬 こころ), a character in the manga series Amanchu!
- Kokoro Mitsume (光目 こころ), a character in the video game Super Danganronpa Another 2
- Kokoro Yotsuba (四葉 こころ), a character in the Japanese anime Kamisama Minarai: Himitsu no Cocotama
- Hata no Kokoro (秦 の こころ), a character in the Japanese video game Hopeless Masquerade from the series Touhou Project
- Kokoro Tsurumaki (弦巻 こころ), a character from the media franchise BanG Dream!
- Kokoro Shigure (紫雨こころ), a character in the 2025 anime series You and Idol Pretty Cure

== Film and television ==
- The Heart (1955 film), a 1955 film directed by Kon Ichikawa, based on Natsume Sōseki's novel
- The Heart (1973 film), a 1973 film directed by Kaneto Shindō, based on Natsume Sōseki's novel
- Kokoro (TV series), a 2003 Japanese television, part of the Asadora series
- Kokoro: The Heart Within, a 1995 documentary series

== Music ==
- Kokoro (musician) (1925–2009), a blind Nigerian musician
- "Kokoro" (SS501 song), a Japanese song by Korean boy band SS501
- "Kokoro", a song from the video game Xenosaga Episode I
- "Kokoro", an instrumental music track from New Age artist Kitarō on the 1994 album Mandala
- "Kokoro", a song by Toraboruta, playable in the games Hatsune Miku: Project Diva 2nd and Hatsune Miku: Project Diva F 2nd
- Kokoro Dance, a butoh dance troupe in Canada

== Places ==
- Kokoro, Benin, a town in Benin
- Kokoro, Niger, a town and commune in Niger

== Other uses ==
- Kokoro (snack food), a snack food in Nigeria
- Kokoro (vegetable), a variety of yam cultivated in West Africa
- Kokoro (Yoruba), a Yoruba word meaning "worm", "grub" or "insect"
- Kokoro (Japanese: 心), meaning "heart" or "mind" in Chinese characters
- Kokoro: Hints and Echoes of Japanese Life, an 1896 collection by Lafcadio Hearn
- Kokoro (food chain), a Korean-Japanese food chain based in the United Kingdom
