= African traditional medicine =

Traditional medical practices in Africa

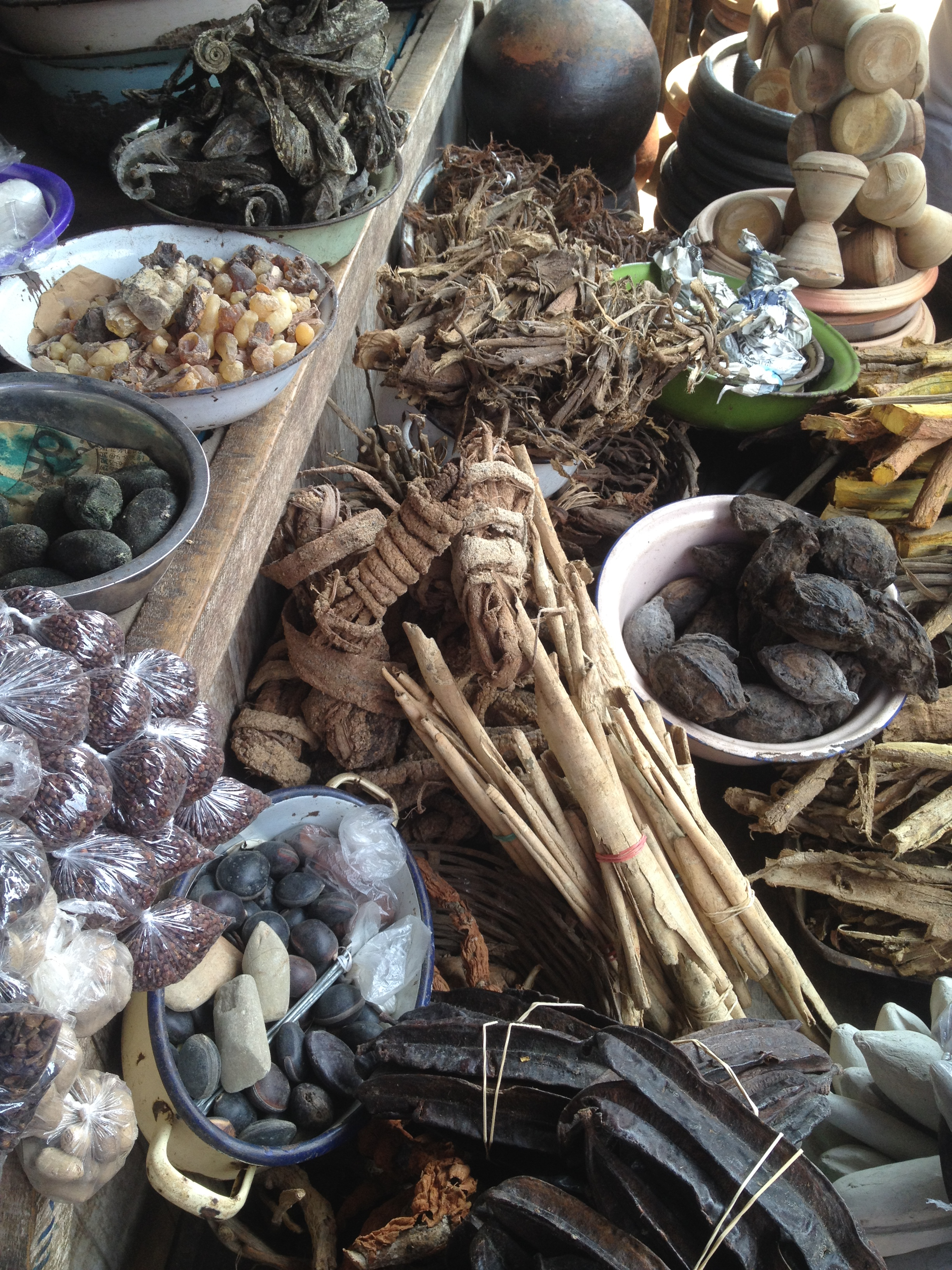
Medicinal plants on a market stall, Ghana, 2014

African traditional medicine is a range of traditional medicine disciplines involving indigenous herbalism and African spirituality, typically including diviners, midwives, and herbalists. Practitioners of traditional African medicine claim to be able to cure a variety of diverse conditions including cancer, psychiatric disorders, high blood pressure, cholera, most venereal diseases, epilepsy, asthma, eczema, fever, anxiety, depression, benign prostatic hyperplasia, urinary tract infections, gout, and healing of wounds and burns and Ebola.

Diagnosis is reached through spiritual means and a treatment is prescribed, usually consisting of a herbal remedy that is considered to have not only healing abilities but also symbolic and spiritual significance. Traditional African medicine, with its belief that illness is not derived from chance occurrences, but through spiritual or social imbalance, differs greatly from modern scientific medicine, which is technically and analytically based. In the 21st century, modern pharmaceuticals and medical procedures remain inaccessible to large numbers of African people due to their relatively high cost and concentration of health facilities in urban centres.

Traditional medicine was the dominant medical system for millions of people in Africa prior the arrival of the Europeans, who introduced evidence-based medicine, which was a noticeable turning point in the history of this tradition and culture. Herbal medicines in Africa are generally not adequately researched, and are weakly regulated. There is a lack of the detailed documentation of the traditional knowledge, which is generally transferred orally. Serious adverse effects can result from misidentification or misuse of healing plants.

The geographical reach of this article is Sub-Saharan Africa. Though, neighbouring medical traditions have influenced traditional African medicine.

== History ==
=== Colonial era ===
Modern science has considered methods of traditional knowledge as primitive and under colonial rule some traditional medical practices were outlawed. During this time, attempts were also made to control the sale of herbal medicines. For example, after Mozambique gained independence in 1975, attempts to control traditional medicine went as far as sending diviner-healers to re-education camps. As colonialism and Christianity spread through Africa, colonialists built general hospitals and Christian missionaries built private ones, with the hopes of making headway against widespread diseases. However, little was done to investigate the legitimacy of the traditional medical practices, despite the obvious role that the traditional healers played in the basic health needs of their communities; the colonial authorities along with doctors and health practitioners continued to shun their contributions. It was also believed that during times of conflict people were more likely to resort to supernatural explanations and would seek treatment involving the supernatural.

=== Modern period ===
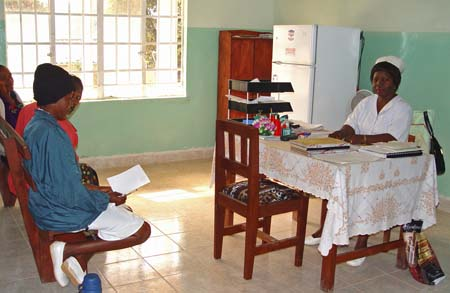
Nurse at Koidu Hospital in Sierra Leone consulting with patients.

For various reasons, in the late 20th century the traditional systems of medical care in developing countries underwent a major revival. These countries also realized that modern health care systems and the technologies that they are dependent on are not locally manufactured and maintained thus making them expensive and rendering the population dependent on supply-chains that might be erratic or politicised. Due to this, interest in integrating traditional African medicine into the continent's national health care systems has increased and the use of traditional medicinal plants is being encouraged in some countries.

== Diagnostics ==
The medical diagnoses and chosen methods of treatment in traditional African medicine rely heavily on spiritual aspects, often based on the belief that psycho-spiritual aspects should be addressed before the medical aspects. There is the belief among the practitioners of traditional healing that the ability to diagnose and treat illnesses are a gift from God. Rather than looking for the medical or physical reasons behind an illness (or a spell of bad luck), traditional healers attempt to determine the root cause underlying it, which is believed to stem from a lack of balance between the patient and their social environment or the spiritual world. In other words, supernatural causes, not natural causes, are attributed to illnesses. According to the type of imbalance the individual is experiencing, an appropriate healing plant will be used, which is valued for its symbolic and spiritual significance as well as for its medicinal effect.

When a person falls ill, a traditional practitioner uses incantations to make a diagnosis. The incantations are thought to give the air of mystical and cosmic connections. Divination is typically used if the illness is not easily identified, otherwise, the sickness may be quickly diagnosed and a remedy prescribed. Sometimes the practitioner will advise the patient to consult a diviner who can give a diagnosis and recommend a treatment. It is believed that contact with the spirit world through divination often requires not only medication, but sacrifices.

== Treatments ==
Traditional practitioners use a wide variety of treatments ranging from standard medical treatments to the pseudoscientific and "magical". Treatments may include fasting, dieting, herbal therapies, bathing, massage, and surgical procedures. Examples of the pseudoscientific treatments include:

- The use of "bleed-cupping" (also called "wet cupping"), followed by herbal ointment and herbal drugs to treat Migraines, coughs, abscesses, and pleurisy.
- Some cultures rub hot herbal ointment across the patient's eyelids to treat headaches.
- A steaming mixture of herbs is both consumed and inhaled in the treatment of Malaria. Fevers are often treated using a steam bath.
- Vomiting induced by emetics is used to treat alcoholism.
- The fat of a boa constrictor is used to treat gout and rheumatism, and is thought to relieve chest pain when applied topically.
- Animals are also sometimes used to transfer the illness to afterward or for the manufacture of medicines for zootherapy. For example, the bones of baboons are used to treat arthritis.
- The terpenoids of the blister beetle (Mylabris sp.) are rubbed into the skin as a treatment for skin diseases.

Consensus between traders of the components of the medication used by practitioners of traditional African medicine regarding what should be used to treat different illnesses varies considerably, even within a small area such as the Faraday Street market in Johannesburg, South Africa. However, approximately 60%-80% of the people in Africa rely on traditional remedies to treat themselves for various diseases. A 2018 systematic review estimated that close to 60% of the general population in sub-Saharan Africa regularly use traditional and complementary medicine products for themselves and to treat their animals for various diseases. Ebola survivors in Sierra Leone have recently been reported to use traditional medicine alone or together with conventional medicine.

=== Medicinal plants ===
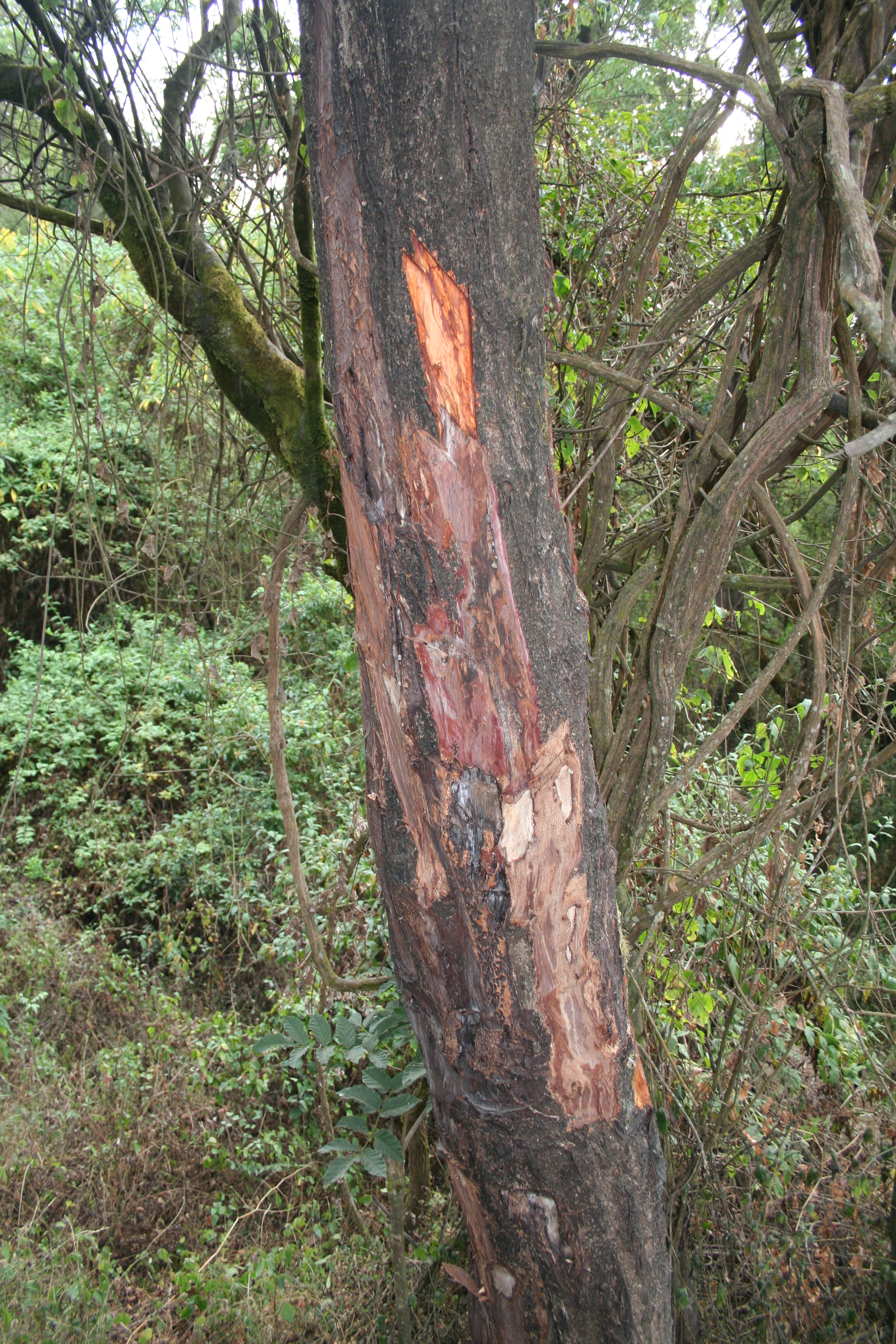
Prunus africana with stripped bark.

There are many plants in Africa that can be used for medicinal purposes and more than 4000 are used for this purpose in the tropical regions of Africa. Medicinal plants are used in the treatments of many diseases and illnesses, the uses and effects of which are of growing interest to Western societies. Not only are plants used and chosen for their healing abilities, but they also often have symbolic and spiritual significance. For example, leaves, seeds, and twigs that are white, black and red are seen as especially symbolic or magical and are believed to possess special properties.

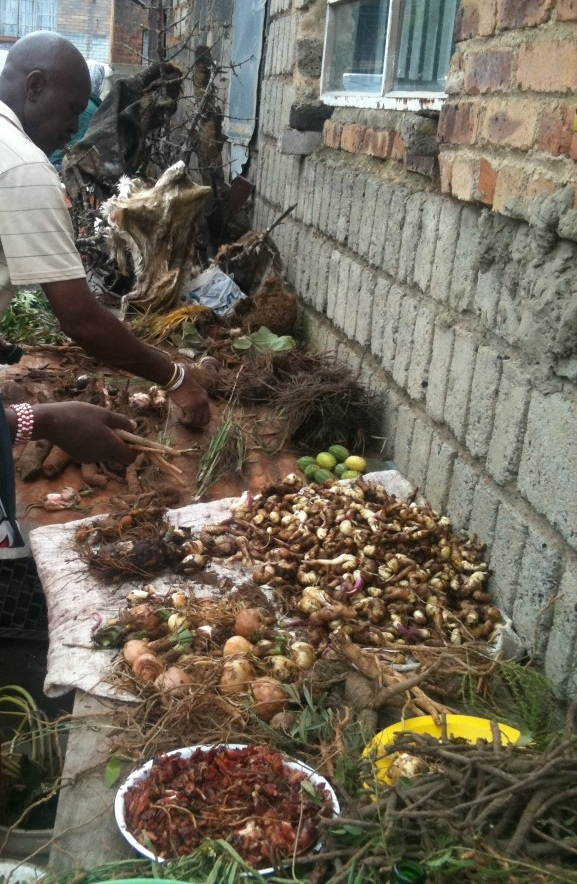
Preparing and drying out freshly dug traditional medicines (muti)

One example of a medicinal plant is Pygeum (Prunus africana), which has been used as a treatment for mild benign prostatic hyperplasia in Europe since the 1970s. Although used extensively in Africa, there is insufficient evidence for its effectiveness in treating fever, inflammation, kidney disease, malaria, stomach aches and other conditions. In traditional African practice, the bark is made into tea, whereas elsewhere in the world it is found in powders, tinctures, and pills.

A 2007 study investigated the effectiveness of 16 plants, growing in South Africa's KwaZulu-Natal region, in lowering blood pressure "by acting as an ACE inhibitor." Of the 16 plants, only one (Tulbaghia violacea) showed promise. It then was tested on rats and "demonstrated hypotensive activity", i.e. reduction of blood pressure. The plants included in the study were:

1. Amaranthus dubius, a flowering plant, also known as spleen amaranth
2. Amaranthus hybridus, commonly known as smooth pig-weed or slim amaranth
3. Amaranthus spinosus, also known as spiny amaranth
4. Asystasia gangetica, an ornamental ground cover known as Chinese violet.
5. Centella asiatica, a small herbaceous annual plant commonly referred to as Asiatic pennywort
6. Ceratotheca triloba, a tall annual plant that flowers in summer sometimes referred to as poppy sue
7. Chenopodium album, also called lamb's quarters, this is a weedy annual plant
8. Emex australis, commonly known as southern three corner jack
9. Galinsoga parviflora, commonly referred to as gallant soldier
10. Justicia flava, also known as yellow justicia
11. Momordica balsamina, also known as the balsam apple
12. Oxygonum sinuatum, an invasive weed with no common name
13. Physalis viscosa, known as starhair ground cherry
14. Senna occidentalis, a very leafy tropical shrub, also called septic weed
15. Solanum nodiflorum, also known as white nightshade
16. Tulbaghia violacea, a bulbous plant with hairless leaves often referred to as society or wild garlic.

A 2008 literature survey was made to assess the botanical knowledge and uses within traditional medicine in Southern Africa for the genus Aloe within the family Asphodeloideae. Most common medical uses were for the treatment of "infections, internal parasites, digestive ailments and injuries." Socially the plants are used as ingredients in tobacco snuff. A 2014 literature survey found that at least 12 palm species in sub-Saharan Africa are used in various ritual practices, including the use of palm oil in healing mixtures.

In 2016 an in vitro study of the essential oil from Erigeron floribundus, used as a medicinal plant in Cameroon, demonstrated good activity against Staphylococcus aureus, "cytotoxicity on colon carcinoma cells" and "ferric reducing antioxidant power." Among the constituents of the essential oil are spathulenol and limonene.

As a result of a study conducted from 2011 to 2016, a traditional medicine from the tropical Olon tree, and another species of genus Zanthoxylum, was found to have synergistic compounds that kill both mosquitoes and their plasmodium parasites.

A 2000 study of thirty-three species of plants, found in the Eastern Cape province of South Africa, that are considered weeds, alien invaders or problem plants were investigated for their uses in traditional medicine. The plants included:

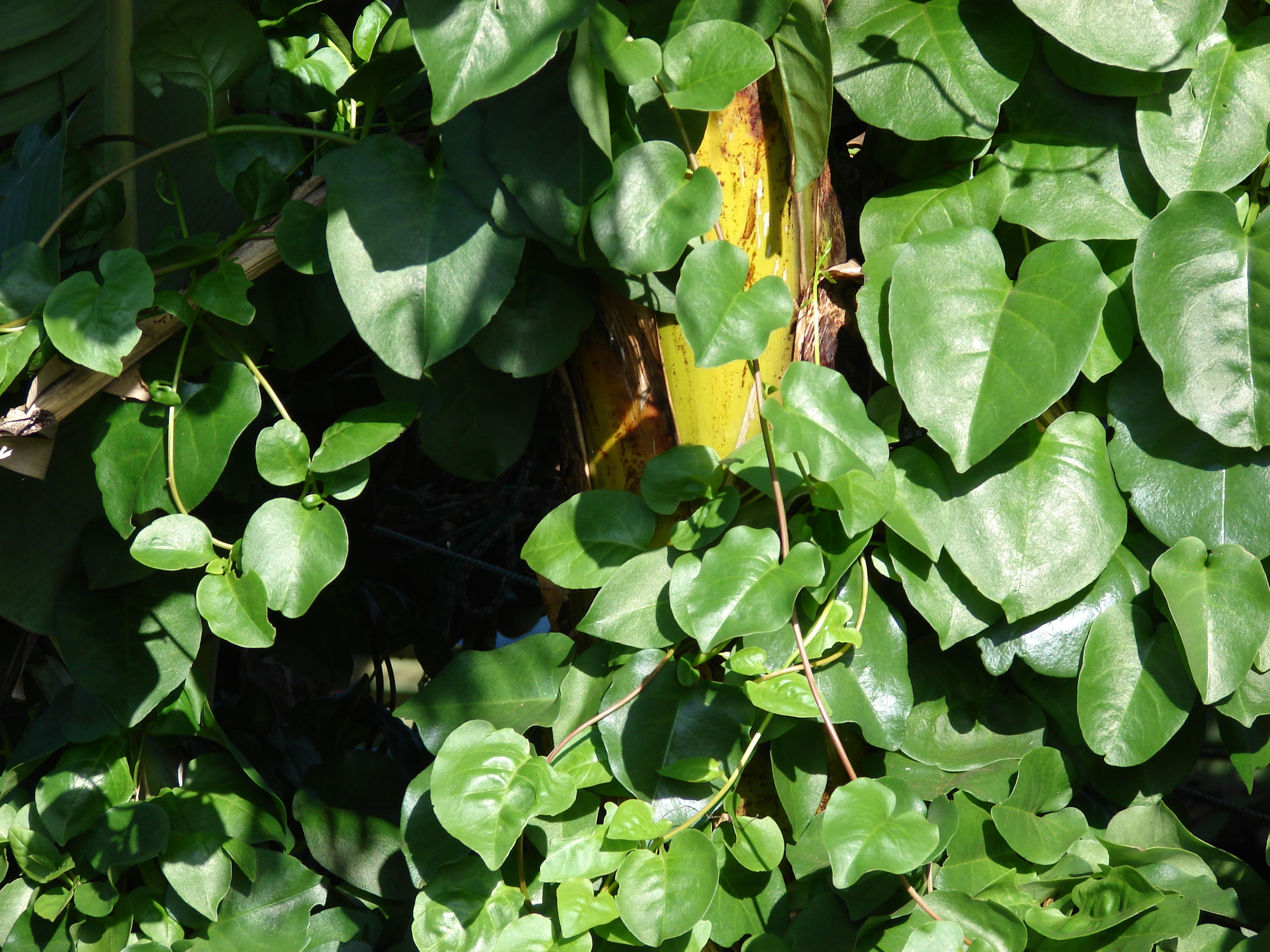
Anredera cordifolia leaves

- Anredera cordifolia (iDlula). Swollen feet from poor circulation and/or liver and kidney problems are treated with a leaf poultice, while the sap is used to treat a rash caused by contact with dirty water.

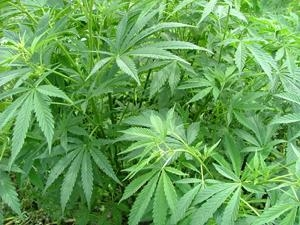
Cannabis Sativa plant

- Araucaria bidwillii (iNdiyandyiya). Grated bark mixed with water is consumed to treat amenorrhea caused by congenital problems, tuberculosis and malnutrition.
- Bidens pilosa (uMhlabangubo). The water from the boiled roots is consumed to treat infertility in women. Bathing in water in which the leaves have been soaked is believed to protect one from evil spirits (imoya emdaka), ill feeling, jealousy or animosity. Also used to treat diarrhoea, colic, rheumatism, syphilis, earache, constipation, intestinal worms, Malaria, ring worm, jaundice and coughs.

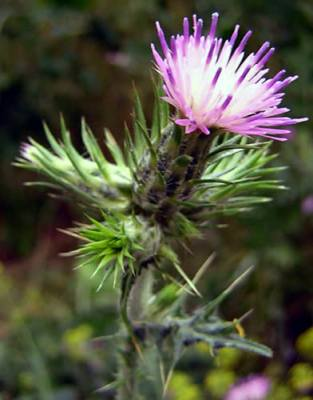
Carduus tenuiflorus plant

- Cannabis sativa (iNtsango). Various parts of the plant are used to treat asthma, bronchitis, headache, epilepsy, pains, colds, influenza, labour pains, hypertension, diabetes, malaria, blackwater fever, blood-poisoning, anthrax, dysentery, tetanus, menstrual cramps and rabies.
- Carduus tenuiflorus (uMhlakavuthwa). The patient is given an emetic and instructed to vomit onto the plant. The belief is that the plant will "suck out the cause of the illness."

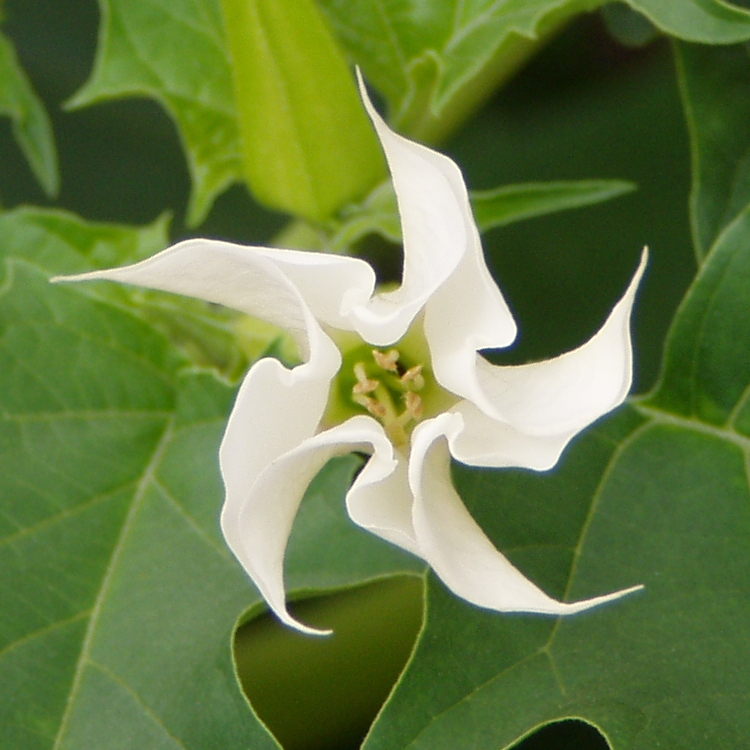
Datura stramonium plant

- Datura stramonium (uQhwangu-qhwangu). The leaves are used to treat pain and swelling (including after a circumcision), boils and abscesses, measles, asthma and headaches, tetanus, foot ailments and respiratory conditions.

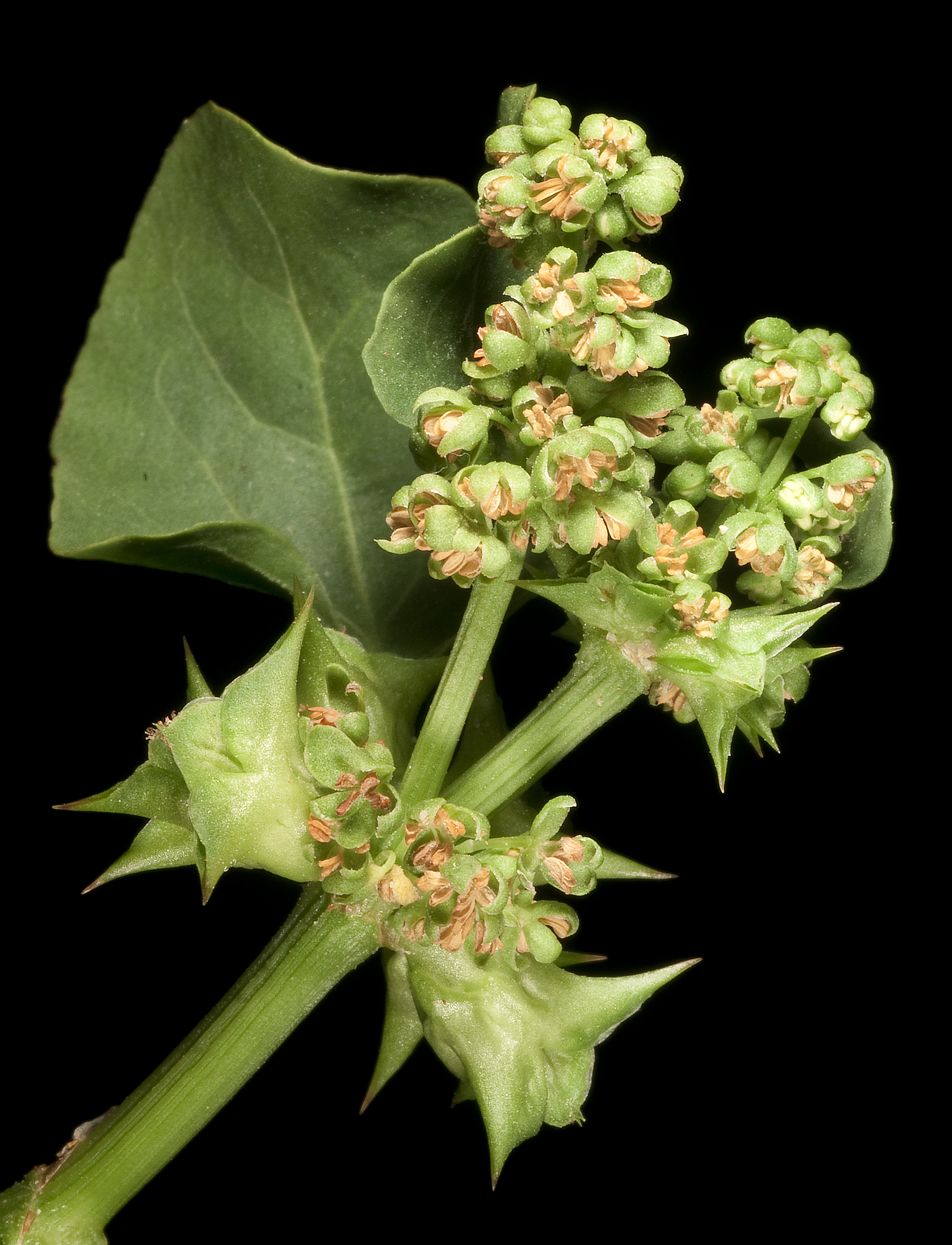
Emex australis plant

- Emex australis (iNkunzane). A decoction of the root is used to treat constipation, biliousness and other stomach complaints and to stimulate appetite.
- Galenia secunda (uMvenyathi). The roots are mixed with Emex australis, boiled and used to treat kidney pains in adults and colic in babies.

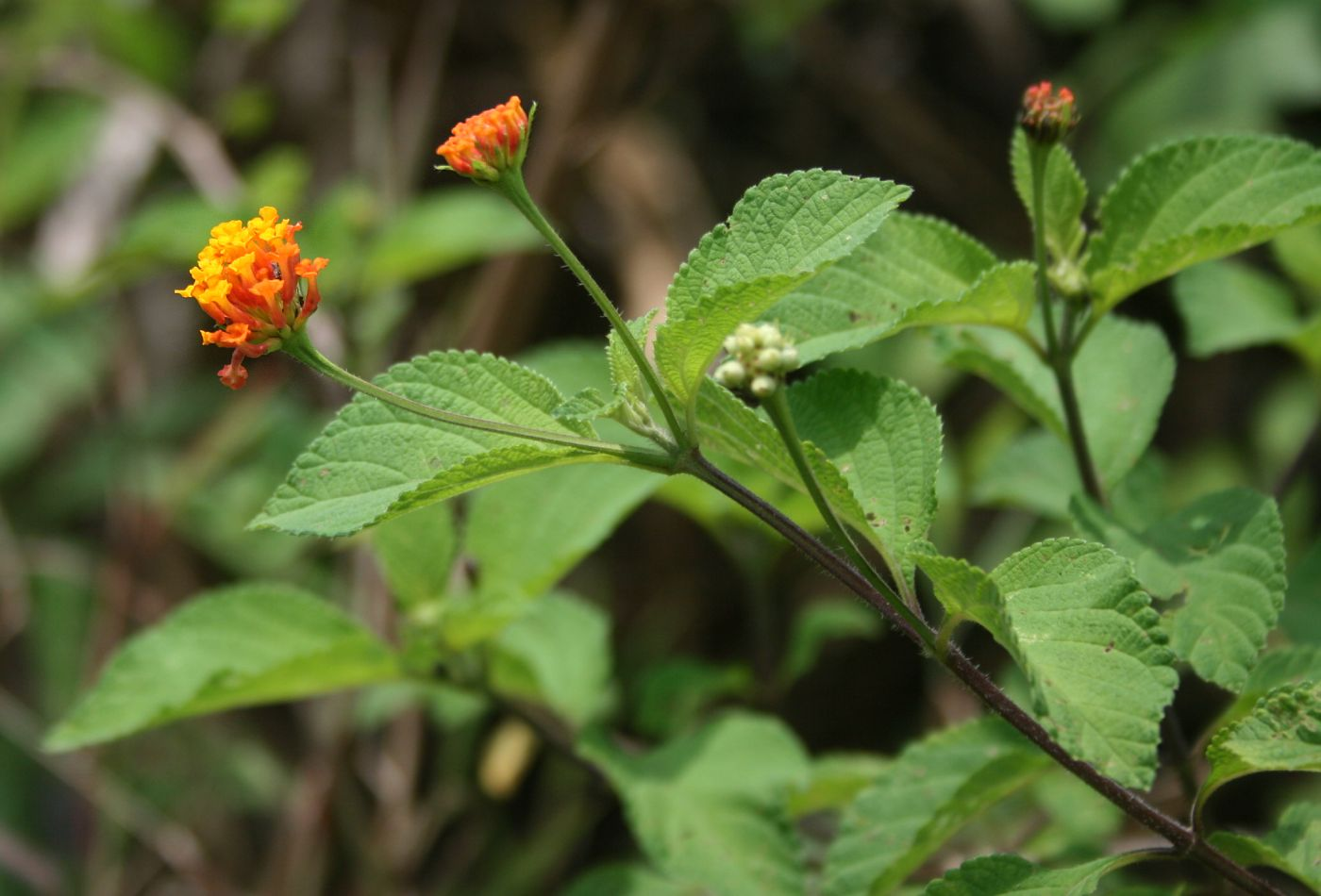
Lantana camara plant

- Lantana camara (iQunube). The roots are boiled and the liquid consumed for lower back or abdominal pain, or used as an enema to treat gonococcal infections and urinary tract infections. It is also used to treat coughs, colds, jaundice, rheumatism and as a contraceptive.
- Opuntia ficus-indica (iTolofiya). A poultice of the cooked leaves is used to treat sores between toes and the fingers caused by fungal infections. The belief is that these sores are caused by "dirty blood" (igazi elimdaka).

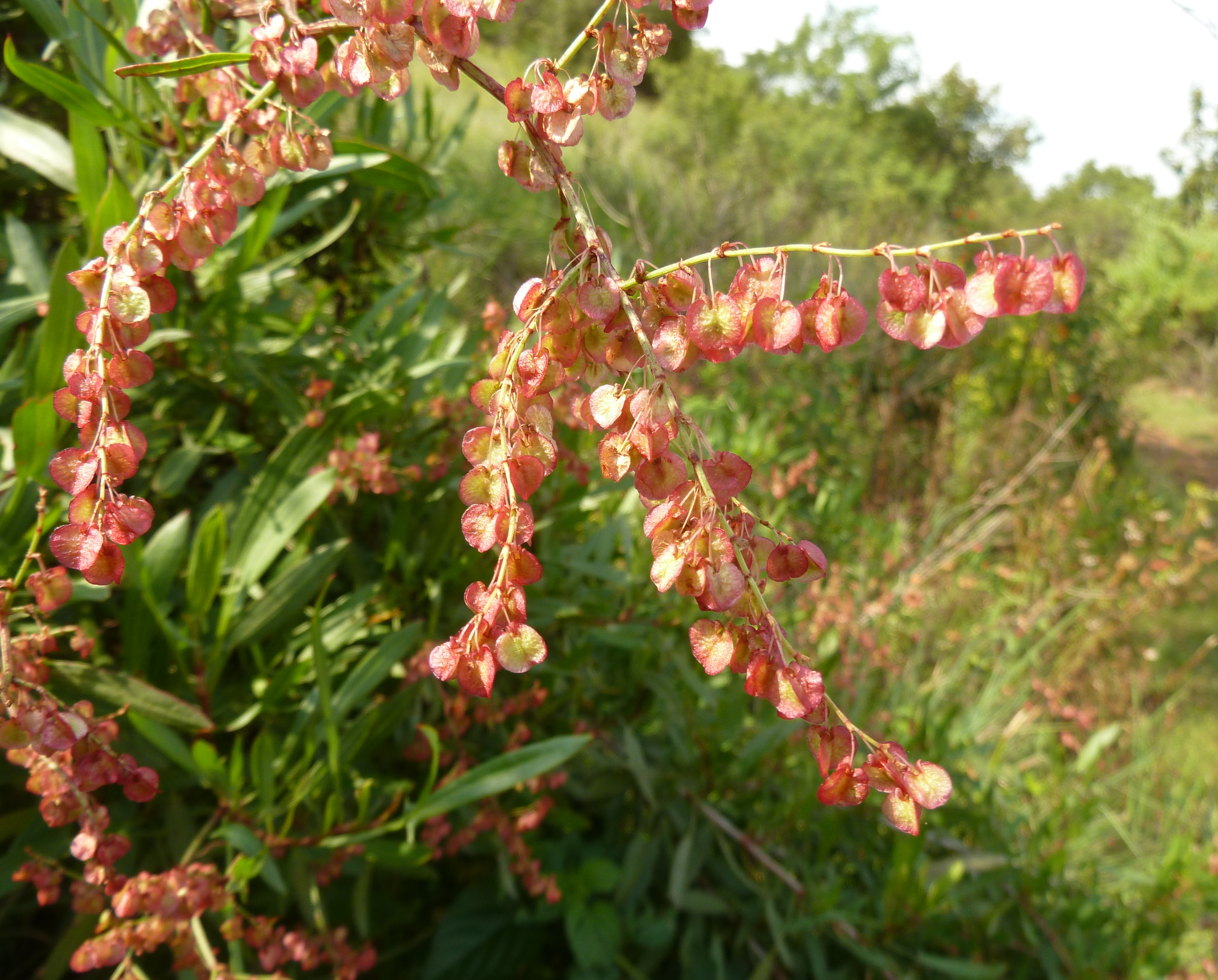
Rumex sagittatus plant

- Rumex sagittatus (iBhathatha). A cold water infusion of the roots are used as a body wash as it is believed to cleanse the body of misfortunes and evil.

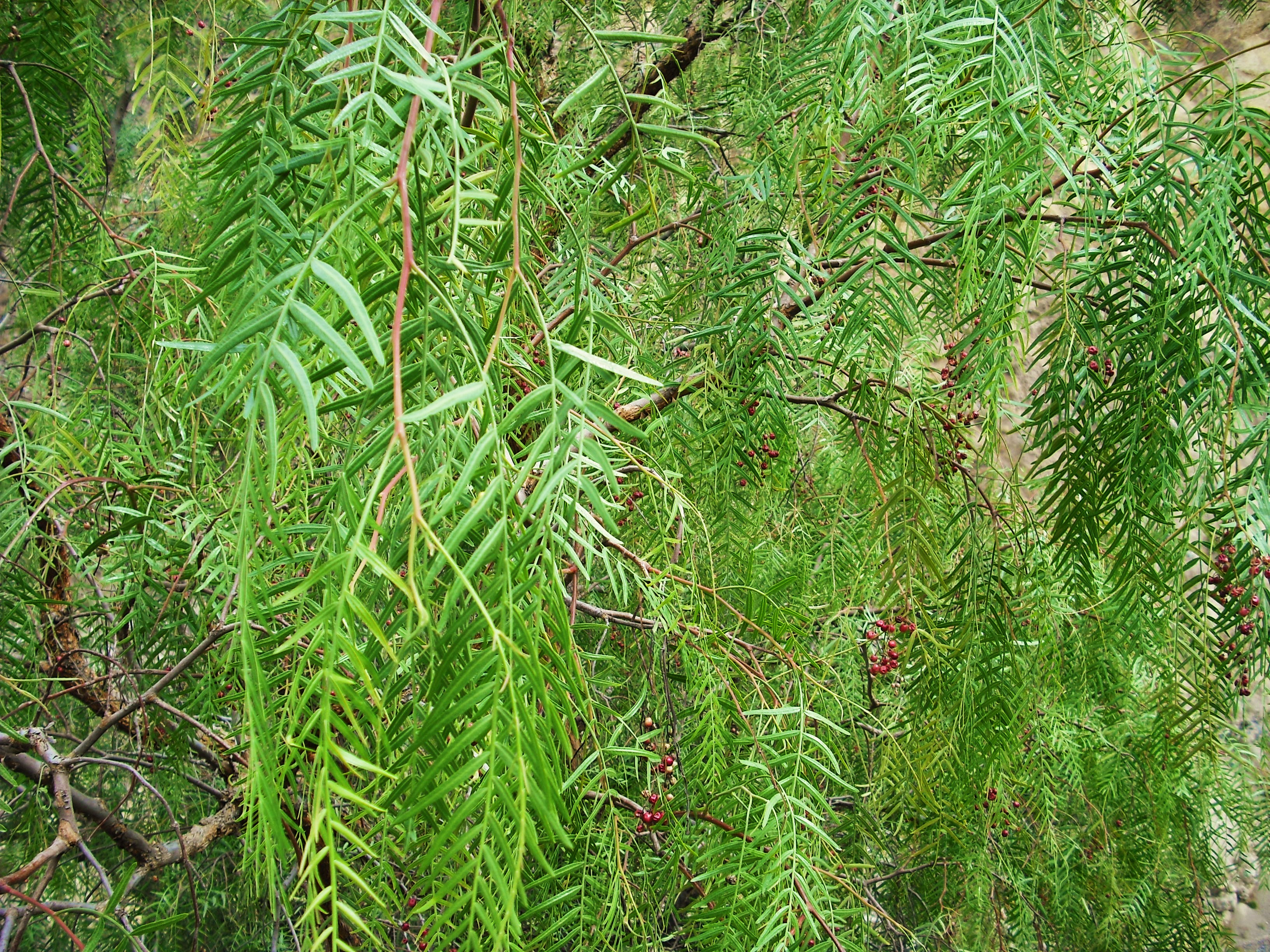
Schinus molle plant

- Schinus molle (iPepile or Peperboom). Fever and influenza are treated by consuming a leaf decoction or steaming. A combination of leaves and bark is used to treat wounds.
- Araujia sericifera (iQuwa). It is used to treat amafufunyana, which is described by Ngubane as an extreme form of depression coupled with psychotic symptoms such as delusions, hysteria, violent outburst and suicide ideations. The roots are mixed with other medications to treat it.
- Argemone mexicana (iKhakhakhakha). This root decoction is mixed with the roots of the rubus pinnatus (iqunube) and is administered through the use of an enema to cure kidney pain.

=== Fossils ===
A variety of invertebrate and vertebrate fossils, including hyraceum (//am uru or /gaous in Nama, dassiepis, dassiespis, dasjespis or dassiepisklip in Afrikaans, moroto oa pela in Sesotho), are claimed to be used for magical and healing purposes in South Africa.

=== Spirituality ===
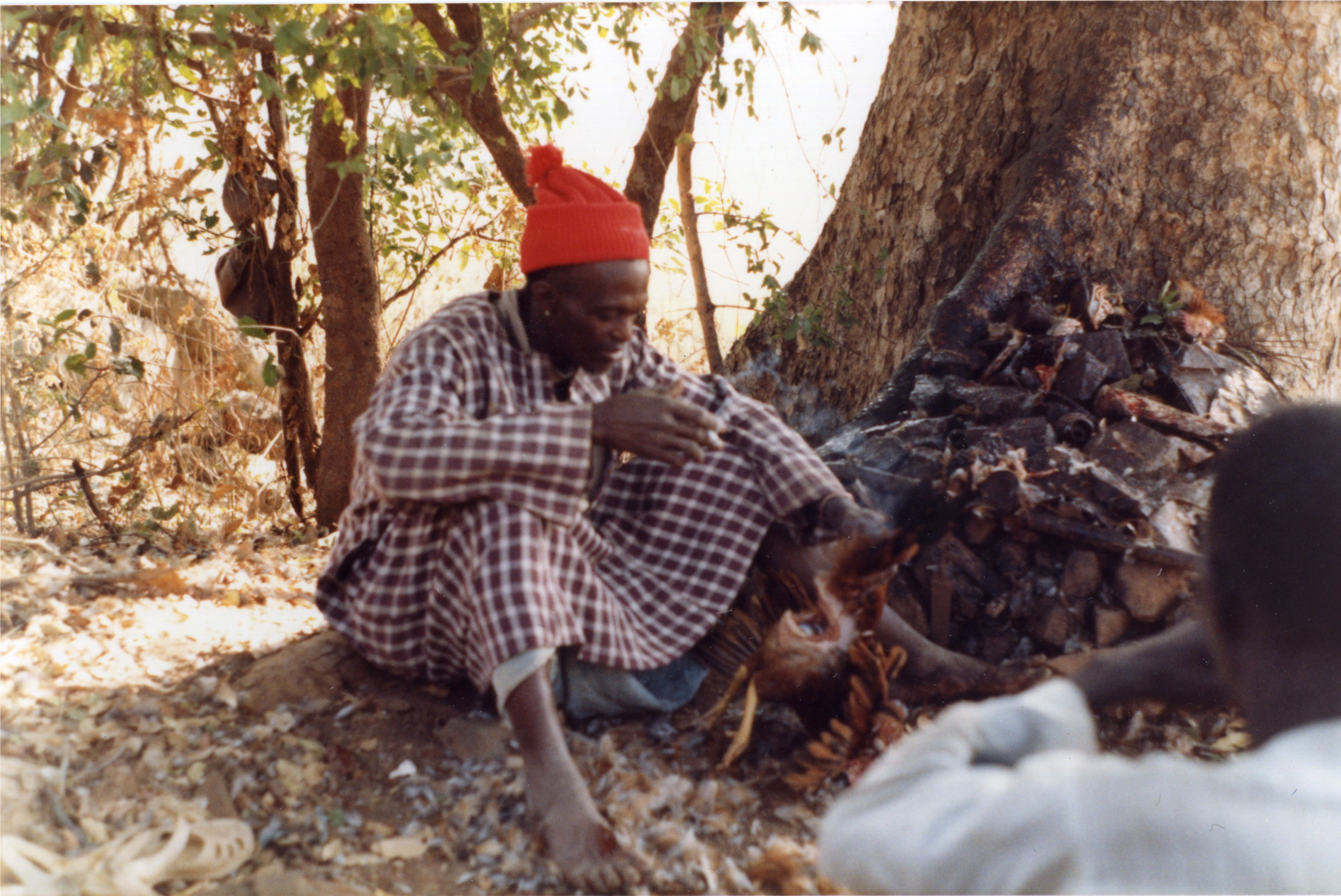
Bedik diviner outside Iwol, southeast Senegal (West Africa). He makes predictions based on the color of the organs of sacrificed chickens.

Some healers may employ the use of charms, incantations, and the casting of spells in their treatments. For example, there is the belief among the Ibos of Nigeria that medicine men can implant something into a person from a distance to inflict sickness on them, in a process referred to asegba ogwu. To remove the malignant object, the intervention of a second medicine man is typically required, who then removes it by making an incision in the patient. A form of sympathetic magic is also used, in which a model is made of the victim and it is believed that actions performed on the model are transferred to the victim, in a manner similar to the familiar voodoo doll. Superstitious beliefs regarding spirits are also exploited and people are convinced that "spirits of deceased relatives trouble the living and cause illness." In these instances "medicine men prescribe remedies, often in the form of propitiatory sacrifice, in order to put them to rest so that they will no longer trouble the living, especially children."

According to Onwuanibe, Africans hold a religious world view which includes divine or spiritual intervention in medical practice. For example, the !Kung people of the Kalahari Desert believe that the great God Hishe created all things and, therefore, controls all sickness and death. Hishe presents himself to these medicine men in dreams and hallucinations, giving them curative power and this god is generous enough to give this power to the medicine men, they are expected to practice healing freely. The !Kung medicine men effect a treatment by performing a tribal dance.

== Traditional medicinal practitioners ==
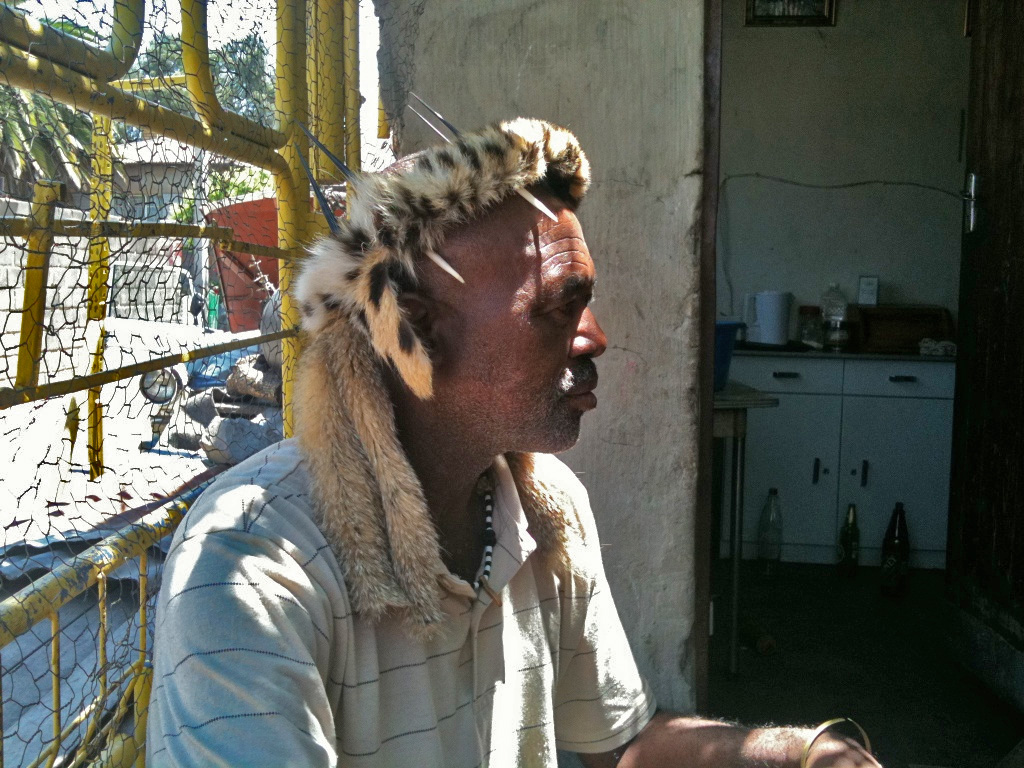
Inyanga/Sangoma from Johannesburg, South Africa

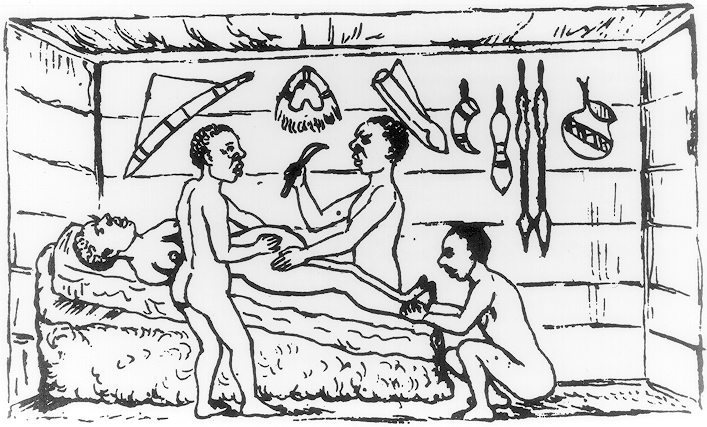
Successful Cesarean section performed by indigenous healers in Kahura, Uganda. As observed by R. W. Felkin in 1879.

Many traditional medicinal practitioners are people without formal education, who have rather received knowledge of medicinal plants and their effects on the human body from their forebears and by observation. Traditional practitioners and their practices vary but common features among them are a personal involvement in the healing process; protection of the therapeutic knowledge by keeping it a secret; and being rewarded for their services.

In a manner similar to orthodox medicinal practice, the practitioners of traditional medicine specialize in particular areas of their profession. Some, such as the inyangas of Eswatini are experts in herbalism, whilst others, such as the South African sangomas, are experts in spiritual healing as diviners, and others specialize in a combination of both forms of practice. There are also traditional bone setters and birth attendants. Herbalists are becoming more and more popular in Africa with an emerging herb trading market in Durban that is said to attract between 700,000 and 900,000 traders per year from South Africa, Zimbabwe, and Mozambique. Smaller trade markets exist in virtually every community. Their knowledge of herbs has been invaluable in African communities and they among the few who could gather them in most societies. Midwives also make extensive use of indigenous plants to aid childbirth. African healers commonly "describe and explain illness in terms of social interaction and act on the belief that religion permeates every aspect of human existence."

=== Payments ===
Traditional healers, like any other profession, are rewarded for their services. In African societies, the payment for a treatment depends on its efficacy. They do not request payment until after the treatment is given. This is another reason many prefer traditional healers to western doctors who require payment before the patient has assessed the effectiveness of the treatment. The payment methods have changed over time, with many practitioners now asking for monetary payment, especially in urban settings, rather than their receiving good in exchange, as happened formerly. There are also a growing number of fraudulent practitioners who are only interested in making money, especially in urban areas.

=== Learning the trade ===
Some healers learn the trade through personal experience while being treated as a patient who decide to become healers upon recovery. Others become traditional practitioners through a "spiritual calling" and, therefore, their diagnoses and treatments are decided through belief in supernatural intervention. Another route is to receive the knowledge and skills passed down informally from a close family member such as a father or uncle, or even a mother or aunt in the case of midwives. Apprenticeship to an established practitioner, who formally teaches the trade over a long period of time and is paid for their tutoring, is another route to becoming a healer.

=== Importance ===
In Africa, traditional healers and remedies made from indigenous plants play a crucial role in the health of millions since as many as 85% of African routinely use these services for primary health care in Sub-Saharan Africa. The relative ratios of traditional practitioners and university trained doctors in relation to the whole population in African countries underscores this importance. Across Sub-Saharan Africa, from Ghana to Eswatini there are, on average almost, 100 traditional practitioner for every university trained doctor. This equates to one traditional healer for every 200 people in the Southern African region, which is a much greater doctor-to-patient ratio than is found in North America. In many parts of Africa there are few practitioners trained in modern medicine and traditional healers are a large and influential group in primary health care and an integral part of the African culture. Without them, many people would go untreated.

Medications and treatments that Western pharmaceutical companies manufacture are far too costly and not available widely enough for most Africans. Many rural African communities are not able to afford the high price of pharmaceuticals and can not readily obtain them even if they were affordable; therefore, healers are their only means of medical help. Because this form of medicine is "the most affordable and accessible system of health care for the majority of the African rural population," the African Union declared 2001 to 2010 to be the Decade for African Traditional Medicine with the goal of making "safe, efficacious, quality, and affordable traditional medicines available to the vast majority of the people."

Excessive use of plants is an ecological risk, as this may lead to their extinction.

== In relation to women ==
Women in Sub-Saharan rural African communities are almost entirely responsible for domestic work in their households. These women are often at higher risk for disease and poverty than their male counter-parts and have less control over their daily lives than them. A literature survey from 2001 found that these women defined 'good health' as the ability to perform domestic duties and the state of being disease free. Furthermore, the study found that they attributed poor health to supernatural, evil forces, that illness is seen as a form of punishment from spirits. In another study, which explored the HIV/AIDS epidemic in Ghana, women identified HIV/AIDS with reprobate behaviour, such as "prostitution, promiscuity, and extramarital relationships", or traveling to areas outside the community.

These women endure arduous conditions and a traditional healer plays an instrumental role in their daily lives. The traditional healer provides health care to the rural communities and represents him/herself as an honorable cultural leader and educator. An advantage of the traditional healer in rural areas is that they are conveniently located within the community. Modern medicine is normally not as accessible in rural areas because it is much more costly. Older rural women particularly tend to utilize traditional healers in their communities. Younger women and the urbanized have been found to be renouncing the use of traditional healers.

A 2001 study of rural Ethiopian women where HIV was present found that they rejected the presence of HIV in rural villages and claimed it was an urban illness, despite the presence of HIV in the rural communities. However, these women also claimed that their communities did not advocate for prevention, but rather treated an illness once it was present.

== Traditional African healers and HIV/AIDS ==
=== Role ===
For patients with HIV/AIDS, traditional healers provided a local, familiar, and accessible option compared to biomedical personnel who were usually overbooked and located farther away. Traditional healers were seen as having an authoritative role in physical, psychological, and spiritual aspects of health. In the early 1980s in southwestern Uganda, it was reported that many locals infected with the disease ("Slim") after showing symptoms of diarrhoea and weight-loss would consult traditional healers due to their belief in the connection between the disease and witchcraft.

=== Criticism ===
During the HIV/AIDS epidemic traditional healers' methods were criticised by practitioners of modern medicine, and in particular the use of certain herbal treatments for HIV/AIDS. According to Edward Mills, herbal remedies are used as a therapy for HIV-symptoms such as "dermatological disorders, nausea, depression, insomnia, and weakness." While some of these remedies have been beneficial, the herbal treatments hypoxis and sutherlandia "may put the patients at risk for antiretroviral treatment failure, viral resistance, or drug toxicity" since they interact with antiretroviral treatments and prevent the expression of CYP3A4 and P-glycoprotein. This results in the inhibition of drug metabolism and transport. Peltzer et al. also found that an important issue with herbal medicines used in traditional medicine is that when a patient decides to see a doctor in addition to a traditional healer, they do not always mention that he or she is taking an herbal medicine. Herbal medicines can interact with the modern medicine prescribed by the doctor to treat HIV and negatively impact the patient. Peltzer et al. mentions that a "IGM-1 seem to be effective in symptom improvement, but generally no significant effect on antiviral or immunity enhancement among reviewed herbs was seen" for the treatment of HIV. Since HIV is such a volatile disease, it is imperative to try to boost the patient's immunity, not just relieve symptoms.

The ethical issue, as presented by modern medicine, is the complete lack of clinical trials to test any traditional African medicine before practicing with it on the public. Modern medicine in the United States is subject to The Nuremberg Code and the related Declaration of Helsinki which are the basis for the Code of Federal Regulations issued by the United States Department of Health and Human Services, to oblige humane behavior in experimenting on the public for the good of society. Since traditional African healers do not have to adhere to the Nuremberg code, there is a potential danger to society when healers do not practice medicine humanely.

Traditional healers have also been under scrutiny during the HIV/AIDS epidemic for unsanitary medical practices. The "re-use of medical instruments and lack of hygienic habits such as hand washing" have contributed to the spread of infectious diseases by traditional healers. A study of traditional healers in Nigeria found that 60% of the population was at risk because of the contamination spread by tradition healers.

Women experience the most fatal impact from the HIV/AIDS epidemic. When industrial development required the labor of men from rural communities, the men often left those communities and while away at the migratory camps many of these men would have sex with prostitutes, become infected with HIV and return home with it. Furthermore, since traditional medicine does not have an early detection method, infectious diseases are often spread unknowingly, allowing the 3.1 million people infected with HIV in sub-Saharan Africa to grow exponentially to 25.4 million in 2004. The patriarchal culture that defines traditional marriages in rural areas, places female sexuality under male control and decrees that women are not permitted to discuss and practice safe sex with their partners, which results in a higher risk for HIV exposure for women in rural areas.

=== Modern medicine ===
Sub-Saharan countries have found ways to unite modern medicine with traditional medicine due to the urgency of the HIV/AIDS epidemic. In South Africa, the Kundalia Foundation has provided funding to train traditional healers on HIV/AIDS. The training included prevention, safe sex, and knowledge about the virus.

== Relationship with modern medicine ==
There has been more interest expressed recently in the effects of some of the medicinal plants of Africa. "The pharmaceutical industry has come to consider traditional medicine as a source for identification of bio-active agents that can be used in the preparation of medicine." Pharmaceutical industries are looking into the medicinal effects of the most commonly and widely used plants to use in drugs. In comparing the techniques of African healers and Western techniques, T. Adeoze Lambo, a Nigerian psychiatrist, stated in 1979, "At about three years ago, we made an evaluation, a programme of their work, and compared this with our own, and we discovered that actually they were scoring almost sixty percent success in their treatment of neurosis. And we were scoring forty percent-in fact, less than forty percent."

=== Effectiveness ===
Herbal medicines in Africa are generally not adequately researched and are weakly regulated. There is a lack of the detailed documentation of the traditional knowledge, which is generally transferred orally. A literature survey in 2014, indicated that several African medicinal plants contain bioactive anti-trypanosomal compounds that could be used for the treatment of African trypanosomiasis ("Sleeping sickness") but no clinical studies had been conducted on them. A 2008 literature survey found that only a small proportion of ethnoveterinary medicine plants in South Africa had been researched for biological activity. A literature survey conducted in 2013 identified several compounds (mostly glucosides, sterols and sterolins) contained in the Hypoxis species, (known locally as inkomfe or African potato) that had been isolated and tested with "promising prospects reported in some studies". South African sangomas have been long and vocal advocates of a local traditional plant called unwele or kankerbos (Sutherlandia frutescens) claiming it assists in the treatment of HIV/AIDS, cancer and tuberculosis. A review of preclinical data on Sutherlandia frutescens show no toxity and justify controlled clinical studies. However, when used in conjunction with antiretroviral treatments, the herbal treatments hypoxis and sutherlandia "may put the patients at risk for antiretroviral treatment failure, viral resistance, or drug toxicity" since they interact with antiretroviral treatments and prevent the expression of CYP3A4 and P-glycoprotein.

There have been attempts to assess some traditional medicines through clinical trials, although none have so far reached phase III.

=== Safety ===
A small proportion of ethnoveterinary medicine plants in South Africa have been researched for toxic effects. The possible adverse effects of South African traditional medicines are not well documented; there has been limited research into mutagenic properties and heavy metal contamination. Serious adverse effects, even death, can result from misidentification or misuse of healing plants. For example, various aloe plants are widely used in traditional African medicine, but some varieties, such as Aloe globuligemma, are toxic and can cause death. The potential for traditional African medicine and pharmacokinetic interactions is unknown, especially interactions between traditional treatments and antiretroviral drugs for HIV/AIDS. Herbal treatments are frequently used in Africa as a primary treatment for HIV/AIDS and for HIV-related issues. Collaboration with traditional healers has been recommended to determine what herbal treatments are used for HIV and to educate people supplying alternative treatments against unsafe practices. Given the demands of the local population on the use of traditional African medicine, it has been proposed that South African medical schools should inform medical students about traditional, supplementary and alternative medicine and the possible conflicts and interactions with modern medicine. Use of traditional African medicines as antivirals instead of using specific antiretroviral drugs, is especially a risk with HIV.

Cultural expectations play an important role in treatment as a 1985 study amongst the Mende people of Sierra Leone showed that treatment decisions were made "largely on traditional notions of the efficacy of a medicine of a particular color, consistency, taste, size and reputed success in treating analogous illnesses". This led to the inappropriate use of many modern medicines by the Mende.

== See also ==
- Infant oral mutilation
- Pharmacognosy
- San healing practices
- Traditional and Modern Health Practitioners Together against AIDS
- Traditional Hausa medicine
- Yorùbá medicine
- Plant Resources of Tropical Africa
- Ancient Egyptian medicine

== Bibliography ==
- Bruchhausen, Walter (2018). Medicalized Healing in East Africa: The Separation of Medicine and Religion by Politics and Science. In: Lüddeckens, D., & Schrimpf, M. (2018). Medicine – religion – spirituality: Global perspectives on traditional, complementary, and alternative healing. Bielefeld: transcript Verlag. ISBN 978-3-8376-4582-8, pp. 23–56.
- Sobiecki, Jean-Francois (2023). African Psychoactive Plants: Journeys in Phytoalchemy. ISBN 978-0-6397-6385-9
