= Saegusa =

Saegusa is a surname. Notable people with the surname include:

- Chiaki Saegusa (born 1997), Japanese rugby player
- Kazuko Saegusa (1929–2003), Japanese novelist
- Kokoro Saegusa (born 1987), Japanese fashion model
- Shigeaki Saegusa (born 1942), Japanese composer
