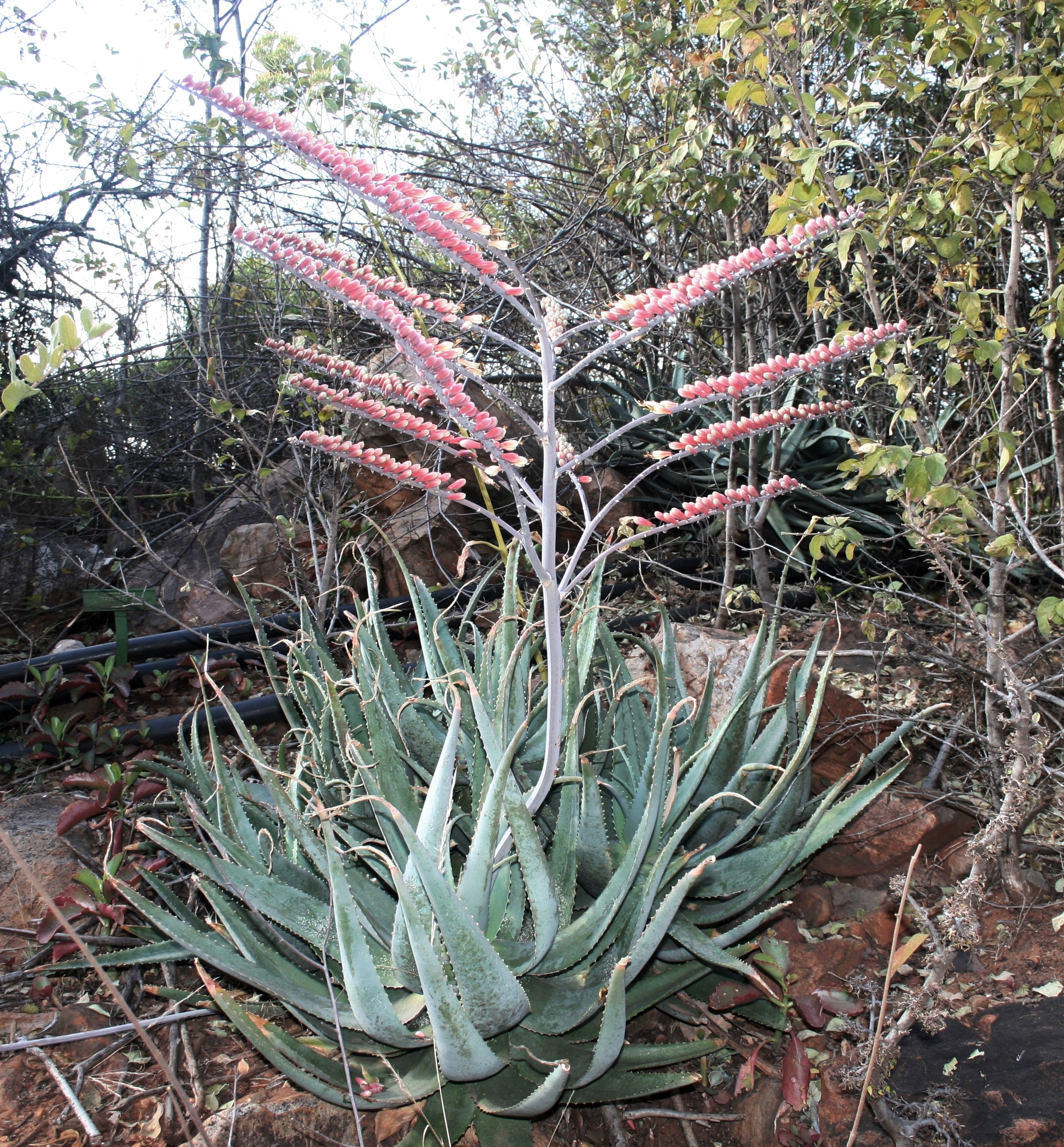
- Habit in the Pretoria National Botanical Garden

Conservation status
- CITES Appendix II

Scientific classification
- Kingdom: Plantae
- Clade: Tracheophytes
- Clade: Angiosperms
- Clade: Monocots
- Order: Asparagales
- Family: Asphodelaceae
- Subfamily: Asphodeloideae
- Genus: Aloe
- Species: A. globuligemma

Binomial name
- Aloe globuligemma Pole-Evans

Synonyms
- Aloe globuligemma Mill.

= Aloe globuligemma =

Witchdoctor's aloe

Species of succulent

Aloe globuligemma, commonly known as the witchdoctor's aloe, is a species of flowering plant in the family Asphodelaceae. It is native to southern Africa where it occurs in semi-desert and dry bushland. It is an evergreen, succulent, perennial plant. The plant forms large, dense clumps. It is harvested from the wild for local medicinal use.

== Taxonomy ==
Aloe globuligemma is a species in the family Asphodelaceae, subfamily Asphodeloideae. The species derived its name from Latin language globulus meaning "little ball", and gemma, meaning "bud" referring to the globular flower buds.

== Description ==
The first description by Illtyd Buller Pole-Evans was published in 1915.

=== Plant morphology ===
Aloe globuligemma grows building short stems up to 50 cm (20 in) in length, forming great, dense clumps by sprouting. The creeping stems are up to 50 cm (20 in) long.

About 20 of the lance shaped leaves form a rosette. The leaves are from 45–50 cm (18–20 in) long and from 8–9 cm (3.1–3.5 in) wide.

The milky white, pale brown topped teeth at the leaf margins are 2 mm (0.1 in) long in 10 mm (0.4 in) intervals, mostly pointing to the leaf's top.

== Distribution ==
Aloe globuligemma is found in Botswana, Zimbabwe and in the South African provinces Limpopo and Mpumalanga in hot dry areas and bushlands at elevations from 600–1,325 m (2,000–4,300 ft), often in large colonies, in bare or sparsely grassed places, often in eroded areas and in open deciduous woodland.

== Uses ==
Aloe globuligemma is used in traditional African medicine. A leaf infusion is taken traditionally for stomach ache, venereal diseases, and as an abortifacient.

== Gallery ==
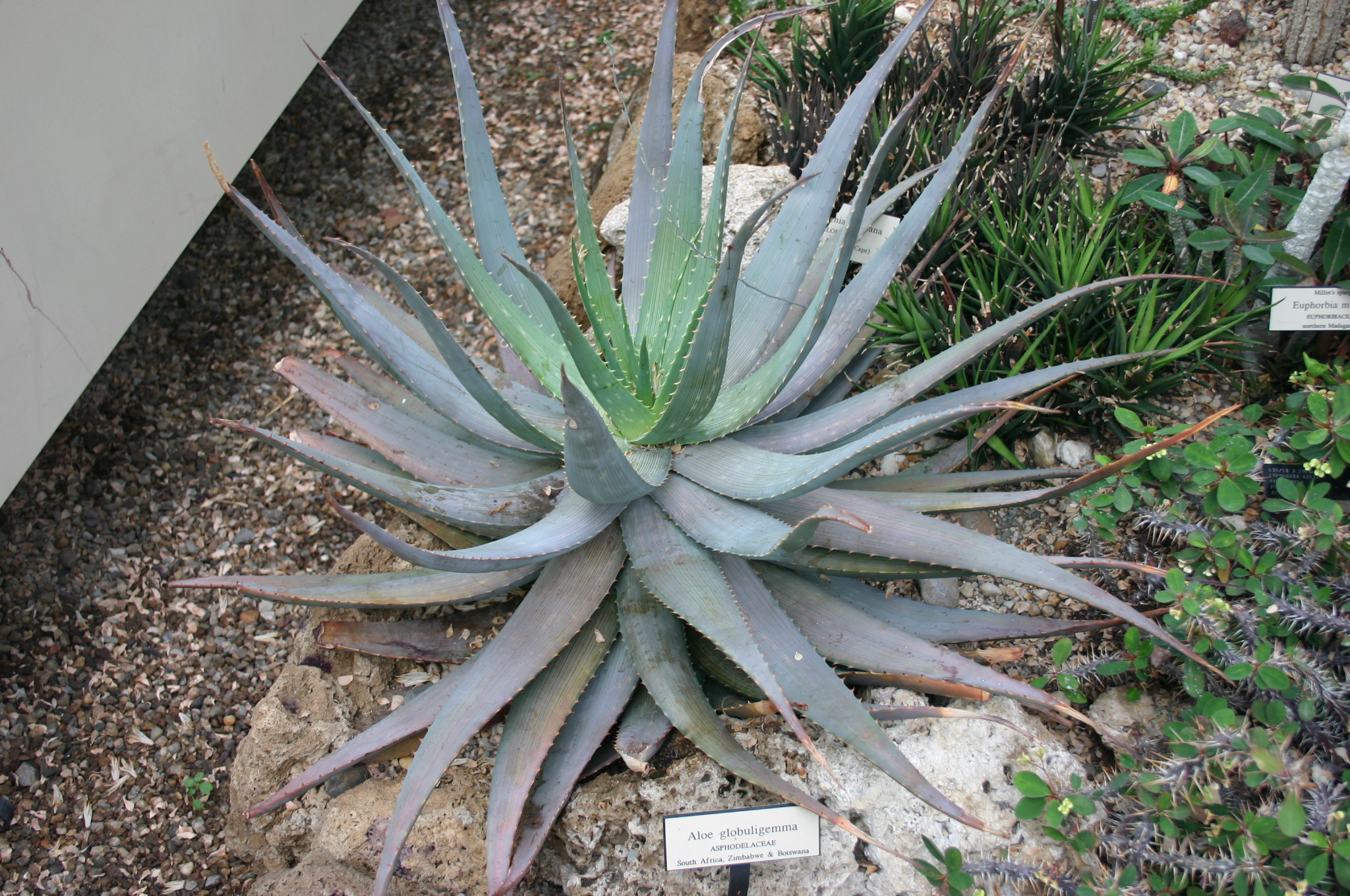
Leaf rosette in the New York Botanical Garden, Bronx

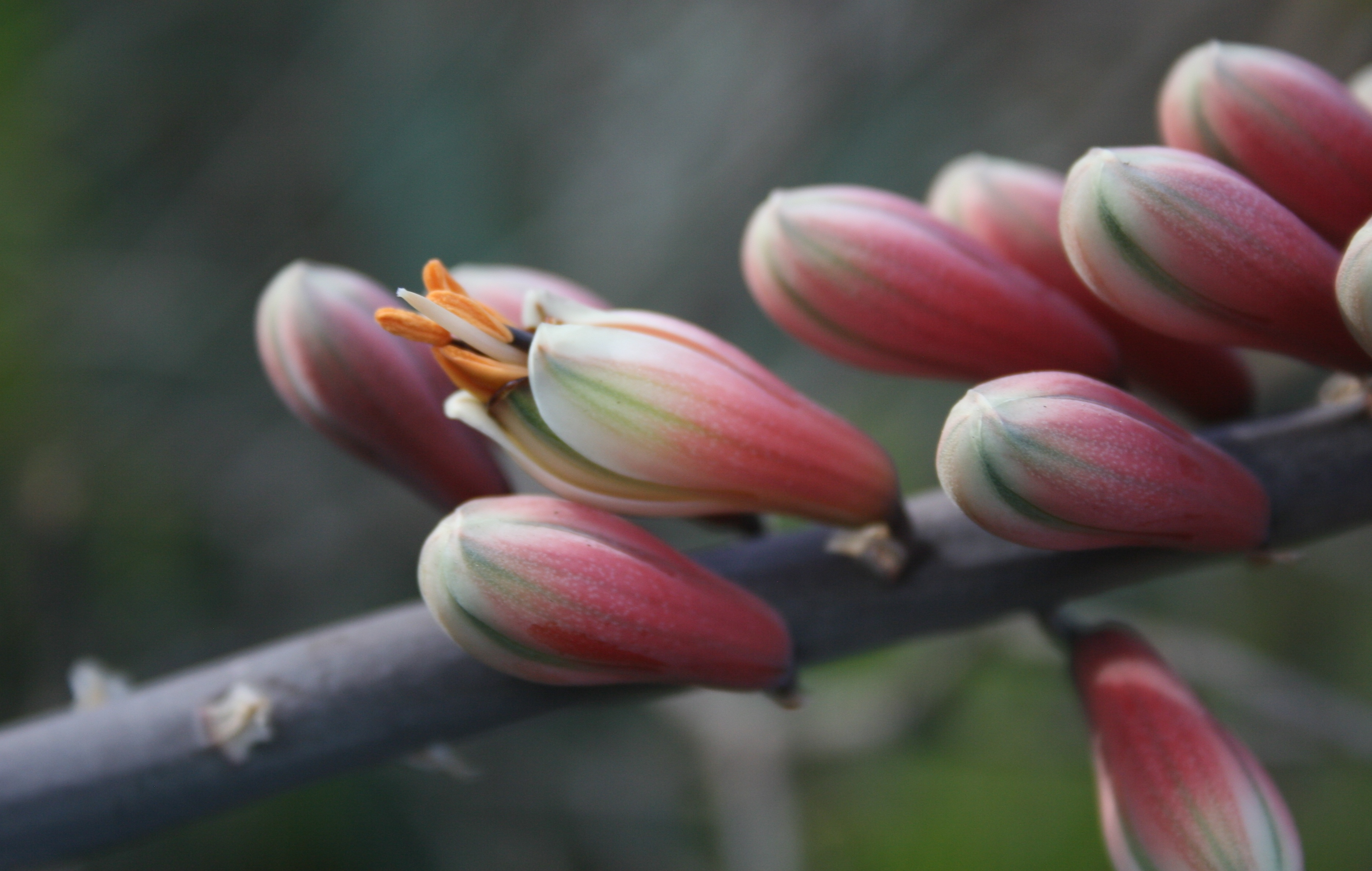
Inflorescence in the Pretoria National Botanical Garden
