= Yorùbá medicine =

System of herbalism

Yorùbá medicine, or egbòogi, is a Yoruba system of herbalism practiced primarily in West Africa and the Caribbean.

== Basic philosophies ==
According to A D Buckley, Yorùbá medicine has major similarities to conventional medicine in the sense that its main thrust is to kill or expel from the body tiny, invisible "germs" or insects (kòkòrò and also worms (aràn) which inhabit small bags within the body. For the Yoruba, however, these insects and worms perform useful functions in the healthy body, aiding digestion, fertility, etc. However, if they become too powerful in the body, they must be controlled, killed or driven out with bitter-tasting plants contained in medicines. Yorùbá medicine is quite different from homeopathy, which uses medicinal ingredients that imitates pathological symptoms. Rather, in a similar manner to mainstream Orthodox medicine, it strives to destroy the agents that cause disease.

Buckley claims that traditional Yorùbá ideas of the human body are derived from the image of a cooking pot, susceptible to overflowing. The female body overflows dangerously but necessarily once a month; insects and worms in the body can overflow their "bags" in the body if they are given too much “sweet” (tasty) food. The household is understood in a similar way. As agents of disease overflow their bag, menstrual blood the female body, and palm oil the cooking pot, so women in the marital household tend to overflow and return to their natal homes.

As well as using bitter plants to kill germs and worms, Yorùbá herbalists also use incantation (ọfọ̀) in medicines to bring good luck (àwúre), for example, to bring money or love. Medicinal incantations are in some ways like the praise songs addressed to human beings or gods: their purpose is to awaken the power of the ingredients hidden in the medicine. Most medicinal incantations use a form of word-play, similar to punning, to evoke the properties of the plants implied by the name of the plant.

Yorùbá traditionalists claim in their oratory history that Ọ̀rúnmìlà taught the people the customs of divination, prayer, dance, symbolic gestures, personal, and communal elevation. They believe he also advised his people on spiritual baths, inner reflection, and herbal medicine in particular.

== Controversy ==
=== Integration ===
Oyelakin suggests that the major difference between Yorùbá medicine and orthodox medicine is that the former is homeopathic in nature while the later is allopathic.

He goes on to say that the orthodox methodology for the treatment of diseases is based on what he called "the contrary principle,"

which states that: illnesses and diseases should be treated with chemical agents that produce effects that are in opposition to those exhibited by the illnesses being treated.

This type of practise is concerned with the elimination of symptoms. However, according to Makinde:

The treatment of a disease is the application of what such disease is forbidden to come in contact with, at whose sight must simply disappear.

Homeopathic medicine is said to be more concerned with identifying the causes of the illness and disease in an effort to restore holistic balance in the biological system. While the claim that allopathic approaches, of which orthodox medicine is a form, is only occupied with getting rid of the symptoms rather than concerned with identifying and removing the causes of illness is not entirely true (e.g., the link between STDs and casual intercourse), homeopathic adherents would suggest that Yorùbá medicine performs three distinct functions:

- Getting rid of the symptoms,
- Identifying and removing the causes of the illness, and
- Maintaining a holistic balance in the patient.

=== Holistic Health ===
Modern orthodox medicine has a place for this concept whereby all aspects of the patients needs, psychological, physical and social, and mentally are said to be taken into account and seen as a whole. However, from the Yorùbá viewpoint, traditional Yorùbá medicine further delves into other aspects in terms of the patient's emotional and spiritual balance/imbalance.Yorubic medicine has come to be widely known in Nigeria as the ultimate traditional medical practice due to its holistic approach to treatment.

In his piece on "Yorùbá Culture" Kola Abimbola stipulates that in order to achieve a holistic healing through Yorùbá medicine, some certain conditions must hold. For instance, the medical practitioner would be interested in the spiritual causes of the illness. To do this, there is the need for the understanding of the constitution of man. For him, a person has two parts which he describes as "the body" and "the soul".

Taking into account one's body, mind, emotions, and spiritual life, holistic health combines the best of modern diagnosis and monitoring techniques with both ancient and innovative health methods. These can include natural diet and herbal remedies, nutritional supplements, exercise, relaxation, psycho-spiritual counseling, meditation, breathing exercises, and other self-regulatory practices. It addresses not only symptoms, but the entire person, and his or her current life predicament, including family, job, and religious life. It emphasizes prevention, health maintenance, high-level wellness and longevity. It views the client as an active participant in the healing process, rather than simply a passive recipient of "health care." At once personal, ecological, and transcultural, holism has become the new health paradigm for the 21st century.

== Òrìṣà in Yorùbá Medicine ==
Tradition has it that many Oriṣa (deities/divinities) play a significant role in the life of the Yorùbá in this form of medicine. And this "Ọ̀sányín/Ọ̀sáín," known as 'the whispering genie,' is deemed one of the most important Òrìṣà in Yoruba medicine.

Ọ̀sáín is associated with dominion over all wild herbs, and is considered by most practitioners as the greatest herbalist that ever lived. In Africa there are so many herbs and plants that can be used in healing, that only someone with a "trained eye" can take full advantage of their functions. For instance, although plants and herbs have their purely medicinal value, they also carry mystical value.

The "Oniṣegun" is said to be an expert in local herbology, possessing the "know how" on herbs and plants and the correct gathering of the necessary herbs and plants for the right cause. Some plants are to be gathered at certain times of the day or night. Certain plants are meant to be exposed to the necessary incantation(s) and implementation of offerings in order to reap adequate results. As said before there are a multitude of Oriṣa, each with their physical qualities and herbal attributes and sometimes interwoven into one another.

Ifá has been said to also play an important role towards achieving the end product of any one healing process.

| Orishas | Attributes | Physical Correspondences | Herbs (Ewe) |
|---|---|---|---|
| Orunmila | Yorùbá Grand Priest and custodian of the Ifa Oracle, source of knowledge is believed to have good knowledge of Human Form, Purity, Cures illness and deformities. His subordinate priests or followers are the Babalawo. | Skullcap, Sage, Kola nut, Basil, Hyssop, Blue Vervain, White Willow, Valerian | |
| Èsù or Elegbara | Often inaccurately translated as "The Devil" or "The Evil Being", Èsù is neither of these but best referred to as "The Trickster" dealing a hand of misfortune to those that do not tribute or deemed to be constantly "unaware" of their surroundings. Also referred as "divine messenger"; a prime negotiator between negative and positive forces in body; enforcer of the "law of being". And is said to assist in enhancing the power derived from herbal medicines. | sympathetic nervous system | All Herbs |
| Ogun | The divinity of iron and metallurgy. | heart, kidney (adrenal glands), tendons, and sinews | Eucalyptus, Alfalfa, Hawthorn, Bloodroot, Parsley, Motherwort, Garlic |
| Yemọja | Literarily Mother Fish is held by Yoruba traditionalists as Mother of Waters, Nurturer of Water Resources. According to Olorishas, she is the amniotic fluid in the womb of the pregnant woman, as well as, the breasts which nurture. She is considered the protective energies of the feminine force. | womb, liver, breasts, buttocks | Kelp, Squawvine, Cohosh, Dandelion, Yarrow, Aloe, Spirulina, Mints, Passion Plower, Wild Yam Root |
| Oṣun | Wife of former Oba of Oyo called Ṣango (another Yoruba Oriṣa mentioned below) is said to turn into a river in Oṣogbo. Yoruba historians ascribed to her Sensuality, Beauty, Gracefulness, symbolizing Yorubas' search for clarity and flowing motion. She is associated with several powers including abilities to heal with cool water, induction of fertility and feminine essence, Women appeal to her for child-bearing and for the alleviation of female disorders. The Yoruba traditions described her as fond of babies and her intervention is sought if a baby becomes ill. Oṣun in Yoruba traditions is also known for her love of honey. | circulatory system, digestive organs, elimination system, pubic area (female) | Yellow Dock, Burdock, Cinnamon, Damiana, Anise, Raspberry, Yarrow, Chamomile, Lotus, Uva-Ursi, Buchu, Myrrh, Echinacea |
| Ṣango | Associated with Virility, Masculinity, Fire, Lightning, Stones, Protector/Warrior, Magnetism. He is said to have abilities to transform base substance into that which is pure and valuable. He was the Ọba/Alaafin of Oyo. He derived his nickname Ọba Koso from the annals of his immortality. | reproductive system (male), bone marrow, life force or ashe | Plantain, Saw Palmetto, Hibiscus, Fo-ti, Sarsaparilla, Nettles, Cayenne |
| Ọya | The other Wife of former Alaafin of Oyo called Ṣango (another Yoruba Oriṣa mentioned above) said to turn into River Niger is often described as Tempest, Guardian of the Cemetery, Winds of Change, Storms, Progression, she is usually in the company of her husband Ṣango. In Yoruba beliefs she is the Orisha of rebirth as things must die so that new beginnings arise | lungs, bronchial passages, mucous membranes | Mullein, Comfrey, Cherrybark, Pleurisy Root, Elecampane, Horehound, Chickweed |

== Titles and Processes ==
An "Oníṣègùn" refers to a herbalist, an "Olóògùn" is one of several terms for a medical practitioner, and a "Babaláwo" is a priest/priestess.

An Olóògùn, in addition to analyzing symptoms of the patient, looks for the emotional and spiritual causes of the disease to placate the negative forces (ajogun) and only then will propose treatment that they deem appropriate. This may include herbs in the form of an infusion, enema, etc. In Yoruban medicine they also use dances, spiritual baths, symbolic sacrifice, song/prayer, and a change of diet to help cure the sick. They believe that the only true and complete cure can be a change of 'consciousness' where the individual can recognize the root of the problem themselves and seek to eliminate it. Disease to the Yorùbás is seen as a disruption of our connection with the Earth.The Olóògùn is often a priest or priestess, or belongs to a guild-like society hidden within tribal boundaries. Even obtaining an education in medicine may require becoming an initiate of one of these societies. The worldview of a priest involves training and discipline to interpret events that are indicative of the nature of the patient's alignment with their own conscious and unrecognized issues, as well as with a variety of external forces and beings which inhabit our realm and require the inner vision and wisdom of the priest to interpret.

Yorubas are believers of preventative medication. They are critical in the way they relate to modern western medicine. According to elite practitioners, when people listen to our bodies it will provide us with the preparation and appropriate knowledge we need to regain our balance with our immediate surroundings.

== See also ==
- Traditional African medicine
