= Infant oral mutilation =

Dangerous procedure in some traditional medicine systems

Infant oral mutilation (IOM) is a dangerous and sometimes fatal dental procedure performed by practitioners of traditional medicine in many areas of Africa.

== Description ==
Typically, a parent may take a sick child to a traditional healer, who will look in the child's mouth and attribute the illness to "tooth worms". The healer will point out the small, white, developing tooth buds as being "tooth worms", and then dig the "worms" out of the gums without local anesthesia and using a non-sterile tool (normally a metal bicycle spoke). The canine teeth are often the ones pointed out, as they are more prominent. The removed tooth buds are then shown to the parent, their small, milky appearance somewhat resembling worms.

== Harm ==
This practice inflicts pain and suffering on a child who may already be sick (or perhaps teething), and in some cases it is carried out on a healthy child in a bid to prevent future illness. The unhygienic methods can cause bloodstream infections, tetanus, pass on HIV, and can on occasion be fatal. The underlying permanent teeth can be damaged thus causing lifelong dental problems. Dental care providers, especially outside Africa, may not necessarily be equipped with the knowledge or skills to diagnose and manage the consequences of this procedure.In addition, if there is an existing illness, the child may not receive the medical attention necessary.

== Geographic extent ==
There is published evidence of IOM occurring in Chad, DR Congo, Ethiopia, Kenya, Rwanda, Somalia, Sudan, Tanzania and Uganda. It has also been observed in African immigrants now living in France, Israel, USA, Australia, Norway, New Zealand and the UK.
