= Kokoro, Benin =

Coordinates: 8.244110°N 2.647705°E

Kokoro is a town in the Collines Department of Benin. It is approximately 195 kilometres (121 mi) from the capital Porto-Novo. It is in the southeast of the country.

== Location ==
Kokoro is a town in western Benin, in the Collines Department. It is part of the Arrondissement of Challa-Ogoi, which is under the Commune of Ouèssè. The town is divided into two sections: Kokoro-Centre in the north and Kokoro-Awoyo in the south. The settlement of Challa-Ogoi, which gives its name to the arrondissement, is located to the west.
