= Kokoro: The Heart Within =

- Genre: Documentary
- Country of origin: United States
- Original language: English
- No. of seasons: 1
- No. of episodes: 10

Production
- Running time: 30 minutes

Original release
- Network: PBS

Kokoro: The Heart Within is a 1995 television series about Japan, originally airing on PBS. It was later rebroadcast on the Discovery Channel. The series was shot in 16mm and 35mm film, with most of the footage shot by the director, Scott Featherstone. In addition to an Emmy nomination, the series won a gold and silver medal at the New York Film Festival. The series consists of ten 30 minute episodes.

== Episodes ==
1. Kokoro
2. Shinto: Way of the Gods
3. Bushido: Way of the Warrior
4. Oceans: Lifeblood of Japan
5. Makoto: Sincerity
6. Hiroshima: City of Peace
7. Nature: Giver of Blessings
8. Religion: Spiritual Heritage
9. Tradition: Inner Harmony
10. Heritage: Pride of Japan
