= Traditional Hausa medicine =

Medicine practiced by the Hausa people

Traditional Hausa medicine is practiced by the Hausa people of West Africa. Hausa medicine is heavily characterized by Islamic influence, traditional African-style herbology, and religious practices which are still prevalent today. Many traditional healing methods such as religious and spiritual healing are often used alongside modern medicine among Hausa villages and cities.

== Pre-Islamic influence ==
The bokaye (singular: boka (m), bokanya (f)) and the yan bori (singular: Dan bori (m), Yar bori (f)) are the most commonly known practitioners of herbology in Hausa society before the arrival of Islamic culture.

The boka was a herbologist who subsisted on collecting and selling medical herbs and advice. It was common for the boka to be a farmer of his own medicinal herbs. The boka was not a spiritual healer; his or her medicine relied on herbs and was only used for minor ailments such as headaches or upset stomachs.

Spiritual healing was carried out by the yan bori, a practice which did not continue after Islam took root in Hausa society. The herbs that the bokaye used, and likely still use, are kept secret from the buyer. To this day it is difficult to determine just how well the herbs work as a healing agent due to the bokaye not revealing the ingredients of their medicines. The secrecy of the bokaye creates an inability to determine the effectiveness of Hausa traditional medicine. The bokaye knew how to use specific parts of a plant, its seasons and harvesting conditions, and where it grew in the wild as well as how to farm it. They also knew how to detoxify certain plants by controlling their pollination, or by cross-pollinating them with less potent plants in order to attain a more usable medicine.

The yan bori were animists, as were the Hausa. The yan bori would pray and perform rituals to spirits based on the patient's ailment. The yan bori believed in spiritual possession and though they had many named spirits to govern over the world, they also believed in nameless spirits which could possess a man and must be cleansed from his body. This faith healing would not uncommonly be accompanied by herbal medicine from a bokaye, assuming the patient could afford to visit both. The yan bori's survival into the Hausa society's adaptation of Islam was facilitated by their willingness to adopt more contemporary, and Muslim, spirits as the societal shift began to occur.

== Islamic influence ==
Islamic medicine as a religious healing method did not take hold in Hausa society until the 16th century. Due to this cultural shift in the Hausa kingdoms, there are two groups of healers defined by their practices and methodology. First are the healers who specialized in the use of herbs and prayer as a means to heal, called the malam and the yan bori. Secondly were the healers who specialized in minor ailments and surgeries, a far more scientific group; their titles included bokaye, masu magani, wanzamai, madorai, and malamai ungozomai.

Although surgeries were performed by the Hausa before and after Islamic influence, they were always very minor, things such as circumcision or removing small abnormal growths. Due to Islamic medical practices, the development of surgery did not continue to progress. As Ismail Mussein writes,

The absence of surgery in Hausa medical compilations should not surprise anyone familiar with Islamic medicine on which these writers heavily depended. Islamic medicine is deficient in writings on general surgery. Apart from Kitab al-Tasrif of the Spanish physician Abul Qasim on surgery, which at any rate, went unnoticed by the rest of the Islamic world, there is hardly any work on the subject worth noting.

Islamic influence over Hausa medicine meant that surgery was not pursued, and did not change. However, Islamic influence brought ancient Greek medicine to the Hausa, even though it did not then build upon that base knowledge.

Islamic influence brought the establishment of hospitals, the use of more modernized doctors rather than herbologists peddling on the streets, and the idea of disease expanding to include more pointed disease and diagnosis (for example, instead of using an herb for headaches in general, trying to determine the cause of the headache and prescribing medicine based on the cause rather than the symptom).

== Modern-day use ==
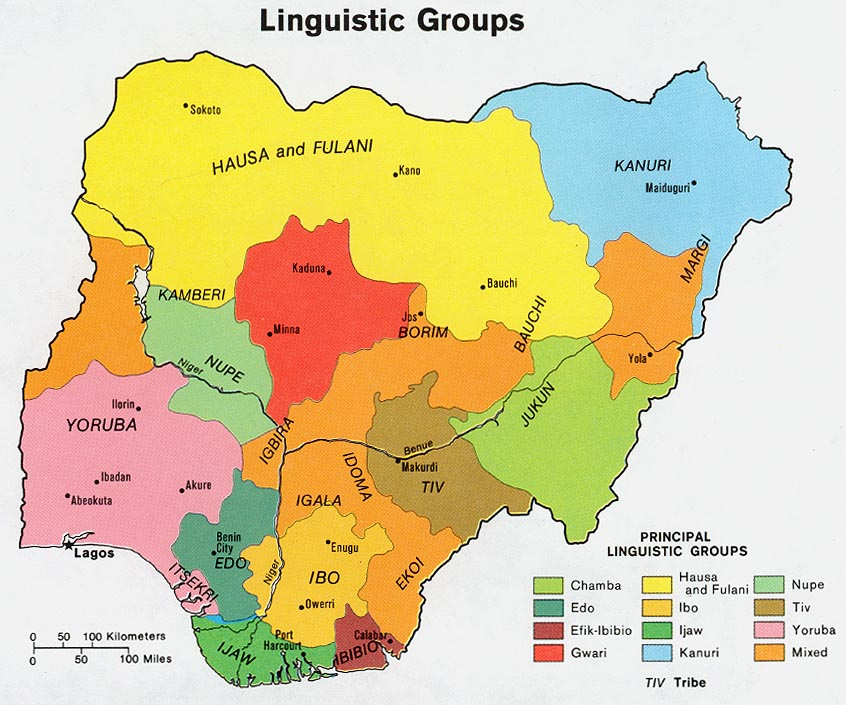
Map showing the linguistic groups of Nigeria in 1979, which also provides a reference for the locations where Hausa is the predominant cultural group

Western medicine was introduced to the Hausa as recently as the 1960s. However, due to strong cultural and religious resistance, it has not become the predominant medical force that the Hausa people rely on.

Traditional medicine is still widely popular amongst the Hausa peoples, with 55.8% reporting that they use both modern Western medicine and more traditional herbology and Islamic faith healing. The popular use of multiple forms of medicine is a direct continuation of the Hausa medical tradition in which they still relied on their herbologists while also seeking spiritual healing from Islamic healers, or even from more traditional yan bori healers that had adapted to utilize Islamic spirits rather than their original pagan spirits.

Even though western medicine has become a factor in Nigeria, the Islamic influence of the Hausa people still persists. British residents of Nigeria, for example, segregated lepers from society; however, Hausa leaders pressed to take in and look after the sick in accordance with Islamic traditions.

Traditional medicine has remained popular due to its perceived success and cheapness as well. For instance, in the case of one young Hausa girl, the nurse assigned to care for her during a severe bout of diarrhea began a treatment of fluid replacement therapy and demonstrated how to keep her hydrated until the severe illness passed. However, the girl's mother would not bring her to a hospital and continued to use herbal remedies reminiscent of bokaye tradition, and the mother believed that although the western medicine helped, it was her medicine that did all the healing.

This practice of utilizing both forms of medicine has caused concern among western doctors who fear that herbal medicines may interfere with, or have detrimental reactions with, pharmacological medicines. Of the people who seek medical attention from both traditional healers and modern western doctors, there is no abundance of evidence to suggest that variables in income, religion, education or occupation affect individual decisions to seek out two different methods of healing. Rather it appears that if both approaches to healing are available, then a majority of Hausa will take advantage of both. The rate of Hausa who used both systems of treatment were significantly higher in urban areas where the availability of both was more common, as opposed to rural Hausa who would only have access to one form of medicine.

Practitioners of Hausa herbology in modern Nigeria are educated in the Islamic sciences and Arabic from a young age. Studying numerology and astrology is also common. These healers thrive by traveling between towns and selling herbal remedies to poor people who cannot afford to visit a hospital, going to populated areas where the medical facilities cannot meet the demands of the people living around them, or by seeing to the desires of people who prefer to rely on a more traditional method of healing than what western medicine provides.

=== AIDS/HIV ===
Many Hausa sufferers of AIDS rely on traditional Islamic spiritual healing methods. However, many rely on western medicine, as antiretroviral treatment (ART) and biomedical institutions become more available and affordable to patients looking for relief from their symptoms. Western hospitals and facilities for AIDS and HIV treatment treat ART as the singular best way to treat the disease, and make little to no exception for Hausa tradition, which makes modern treatment less popular amongst Islamic Hausa people. ART is also made unavailable to Islamic healers and doctors who do not conform to the methodology and practices of western medicine. However they also do not show much, if any, interest in distributing the medicine, since it does not align with Islamic customs and the deeply rooted customs and values of Hausa society.

== See also ==
- Pharmacognosy
