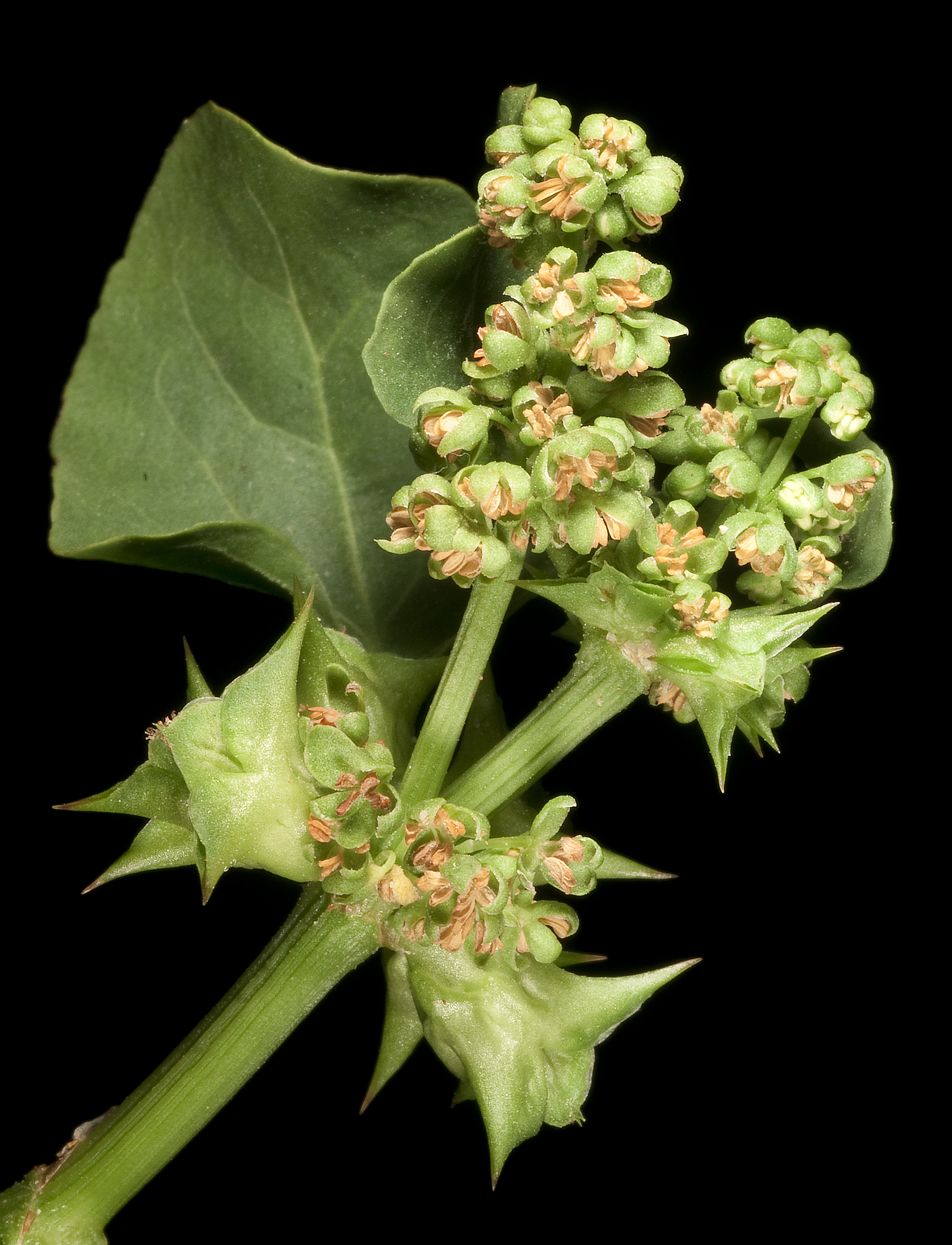

Scientific classification
- Kingdom: Plantae
- Clade: Tracheophytes
- Clade: Angiosperms
- Clade: Eudicots
- Order: Caryophyllales
- Family: Polygonaceae
- Genus: Rumex
- Species: R. hypogaeus

Binomial name
- Rumex hypogaeus T.M.Schust. & Reveal

Synonyms
- Emex australis Steinh. Vibo australis (Steinh.) Greene

= Rumex hypogaeus =

Species of flowering plant

Rumex hypogaeus (synonym Emex australis), commonly known in English as southern threecornerjack, devil's thorn, or double gee (also doublegee, from the old Afrikaner name dubbeltge-doorn - 'double thorned'), is a herbaceous plant of the Polygonaceae. It is native in South Africa and is an invasive species in Australia, Texas in the USA, and Pakistan.

== Description ==
It grows to heights of from 10 to 60 cm and its stems may be prostrate, decumbent, or ascending. The base is often reddish. The leaves are stalked and without any surface covering, with the leaf blade being 1-10 by 0.5–6 cm. There are 1 to 8 flowers with stamens per sheathed bundle and these flowers have narrow oblong tepals which are 1.5–2 mm. The female flowers occur as groups of 1 to 4 per sheathed bundle, and the outer tepals are ovate to oblong and 4–6 mm in fruit, while the inner tepals are broadly triangular and, 5–6 mm in fruit. The achenes (dry 1-seeded fruits not opening at maturity) are 4-6 by 2–3 mm, and shiny.

It flowers all year round.

== Distribution and habitat ==
It favours disturbed sites, on sandy soils. It is native to South Africa and has become naturalised in California, Trinidad, Europe, India, Pakistan, Taiwan, Hawaii, and Australia.

== Weed ==
Common names in Australia, where it is a weed, include: spiny emex, doublegee, double gee, double-gee, three corner jack, three-cornered jack, goat's head burr, goathead, jackie, prickly jack, cape spinach, devil's face, devil's thorn, bullhead, bull head, and cat's head.

=== Treatment ===
Small infestations and isolated plants of Rumex hypogaeus can be dug out. When plants are seeding then they should be destroyed by burning. Control programs work best when all plants are killed shortly after emergence, and should continue for several years.

== Gallery ==
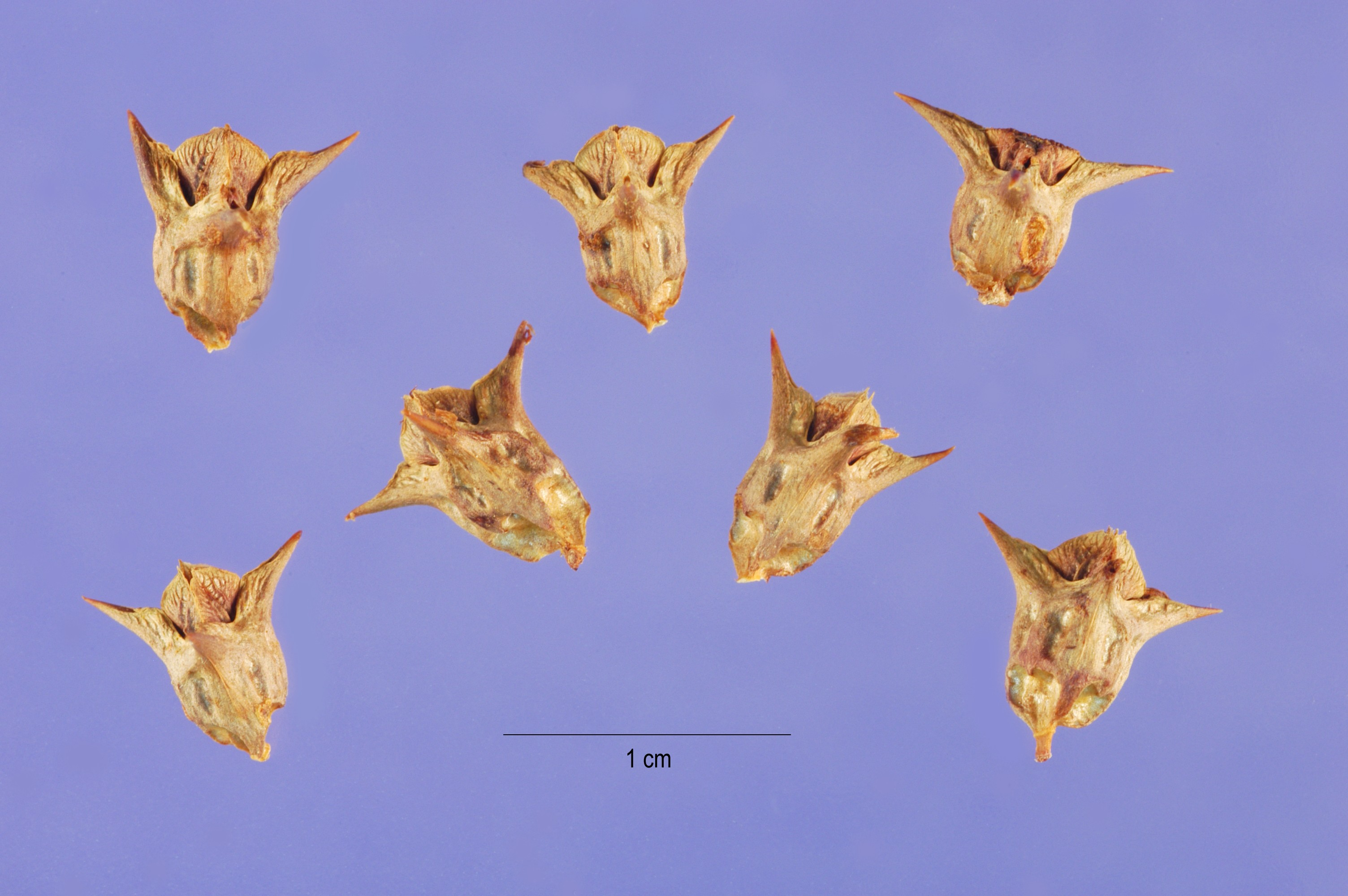
The fruits, most often almost black in colour

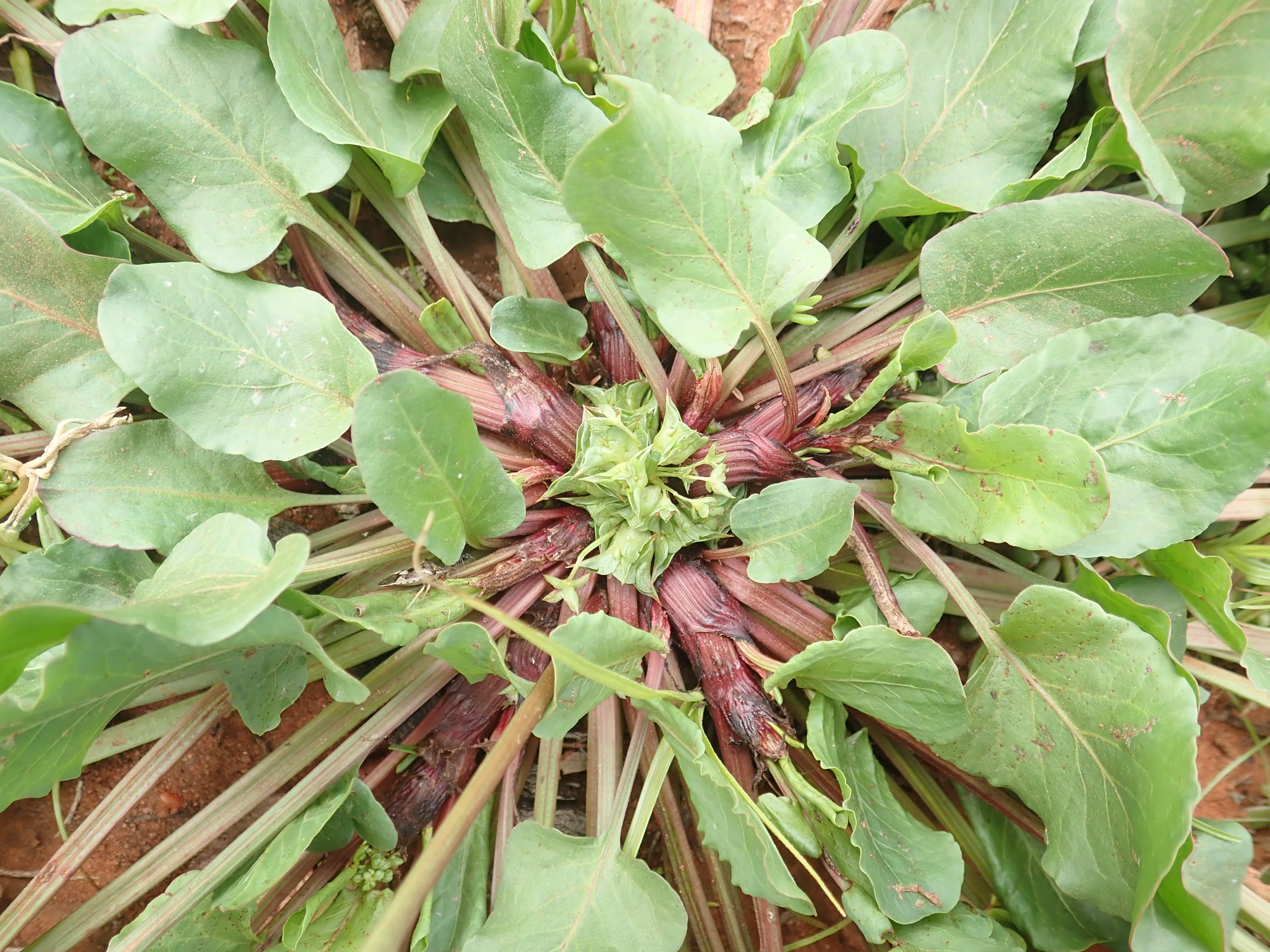
