= Kokoro (Yoruba) =

Kokoro is a Yoruba word meaning "worm", "grub" or "insect". In traditional Yoruba medicine, these "kokoro" are connected with a variety of different types of diseases.

== Medicine ==
The term "kokoro" is used in traditional Yoruba medicine to describe tiny, invisible worms or insects that are thought to live in small bags within the body, and perform useful functions such as aiding digestion and fertility. They are thought to also carry sexually transmitted diseases and other diseases. If they become too powerful, they must be controlled, killed or driven out by bitter-tasting medicines. If kokoro are identified with bacteria and viruses, and the small bags are identified with cells, this is consistent with modern medical views.

== Wisdom ==
The Yoruba of Nigeria have a saying regarding the right to life of insects:

Yi ese re si apakan,
ma se te kokoro ni
kokoro ti iwo ko naani ni
Olorun lo le da a

(Side step your feet do not kill that insect That insect you do not regard God also created.)

Another saying, describing communal responsibility, is:

ti ara ile ani ba nje kokoro buruku ti a ko ba kilo fun
kurukere re ko ni je ki a sun loru

(If your neighbour is eating bad insect, you should caution them, or your sleep will be disturbed at night).

== See also ==
- Yoruba medicine
