= Kokoro Saegusa =

Japanese fashion model (born 1987)

- 三枝 こころ
- Born: June 2, 1987 (age 38); Anamizu, Hōsu District, Ishikawa, Japan
- Education: Ishikawa Prefectural Wajima High School; Aoyama Gakuin Women's Junior College
- Occupation: Model
- Height: 1.68 m (5 ft 6 in)

Kokoro Saegusa (三枝 こころ, Saegusa Kokoro; born 2 June 1987) is a Japanese fashion model. She is represented with Neutral Management.

Saegusa's brother is businessman Yasuaki Miyashita.

== Biography ==
Saegusa was born in Anamizu, Hōsu District, Ishikawa. During middle school, she won sixteen rounds in the table tennis national tournament. While going to Ishikawa Prefectural Wajima High School, Saegusa's table tennis recommendation admission was declined. She later graduated from Aoyama Gakuin Women's Junior College. Saegusa's hobby is golf, in which she won the best score of 83 in the regular tee and 78 in the ladies tee.

== Filmography ==
=== Advertisements ===
Year	Title	Notes
2009	Suzuki Lapin Lapin no Yakusoku, Watashi no Yakusoku	
2009	Hitachi Room Air-con Shiroku Makun S Series	
2009	ABC-Mart Nenmatsu Zaiko Issō Sale, Christmas Sale, Atama ga Cube, Haru Boots, Super Summer Sale / Trekking	
2009	Hōritsu Jimusho Miraio Mirai o. Kamishibai, New Kamishibai, 24H / Fūsen	
2010	NTT DoCoMo Hitori to, Hitotsu. Walk with you Okada to Ken-san	
2010	Japan Post Insurance Flowers Campaign Japan Post × Flowers	
2010	Sankei Living Shimbun Lei wedding Dancing Blossom	
2011	Kanazawa Terminal Kaihatsu Kanazawa 100bangai Rinto Haru no Mahō wa Jibun de Kakeru	
2011	Nintendo 3DS Senyō Soft nintendog + cats Koinu to no Seikatsu: Kyūjitsu / Koinu to no Seikatsu: Kitaku	Internet adverts
2012	Wajima Kankō PR	

=== Advertising ===
Year	Title	Notes
2009	Forestry Agency Ki Zukai Undō "Ondankabōshi e: Kizukai Nippon"	Campaign posters
2010	Sankei Living Shimbun Lei wedding	Image character
2010	Johnson & Johnson 1 Day Acuvue Define "Natural Shine"	
2011	Scroll micro super	
2011	Yagi Corporation Unifit	
2011	Kanazawa Terminal Kaihatsu Kanazawa 100bangai Rinto	Image character
2011	Joyful Maruyama Purisumu Yakata	
2011	Naris Cosmetics Friends Friends Naris	
2011	Noevir 2011 Spring Make Up Festa	
2011	Mac House Women's Style	
	belleVie Akasaka	Posters
	Fancl Keshōhin	Catalogue
	Kracie Ichikami	
	Avon	Catalogue
	Keio Department Store	Catalogue
	Senshukai	Catalogue
	Felissimo	Catalogue
	Nissen	Catalogue
	Aoki	
	Daimatsu	

=== Magazines ===
Regular

Title
steady.

Others

Year	Title	Notes
2010	Gekkan Golf Digest	December 2010 and June 2011 issue
2011	Gekkan Hokkoku Actus	March 2011 issue; cover
2011	Kirei no Mahō	January 2012 issue; cover
2012	Biteki	May 2012 issue
	non-no	

=== Books ===
Year	Title	Notes
2010	Shashin de Kasegou: Torikata	Cover
2010	Teami Daisuki: Autumn & Winter	
2012	Jōhin Kawaī Kihon no Make	Cover

=== Magazine serialisations ===
Year	Title
2010	MacPeople "Kokoro Saegusa no Koko Watch!"

=== Events, fashion shows ===
Year	Title
2010	Kokoro Saegusa: iPhone Appli Hatsubai Kinen Event
2010	Geibun-kyō Haru Matsuri
2011	Kanazawa Terminal Kaihatsu Kanazawa 100bangai Rinto: Opening Ceremony
2011	steady. Shusai Celeb Taiken Tour
2011	Kanazawa Pink Ribbon Project: Message Walk 2011
2012	Furusato Matsuri Tokyo: Nippon no Matsuri − Furusato no Aji
2012	Even & Rakuen Golf Style Collection × Japan Golf Fair
2012	Nihon Hatsu Globally Agricultural Heritage: Noto no Satoyama Satoumi – Noto Kaga
2012	AppBank Store: Tōkyū Plaza Omotesandō Harajuku Opening

=== TV series ===
Year	Title	Network	Notes
2011	Dancing Sanma Palace	NTV	
2012	Kirei no Mahō: Fuyu ni Makenai Tsuya Hada Base Make	NHK-E	Make-up model
2012	Gyoretsu no Dekiru Horitsu Sodansho: Zettai Yurusenai Onna no Teki & Ano Ōmono Shikai-sha ga Yattekita SP	NTV	
2012	Tokyo Precious Dating	TV Asahi	Episodes 3 and 88
2012	Sunday Japon	TBS	
2015	Asu Gol!	Golf Network	

=== Others ===
Year	Title
2010	iPhone / iPod Touch app Kokoro Korokku
