= Matteo Zuppi =

Italian Catholic cardinal (born 1955)

His Eminence Matteo Zuppi
- Cardinal, Archbishop of Bologna
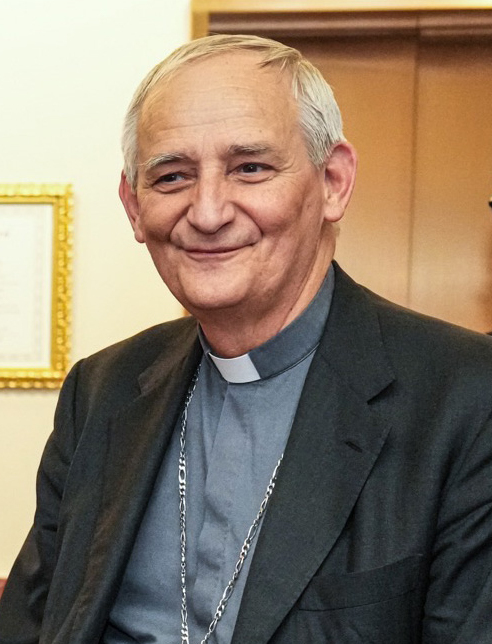
- Zuppi in 2025
- Church: Catholic
- Archdiocese: Bologna
- Appointed: 27 October 2015
- Installed: 12 December 2015
- Predecessor: Carlo Caffarra
- Other posts: Cardinal-Priest of Sant'Egidio (2019–); President of the Italian Episcopal Conference (2022–)
- Previous posts: Titular Bishop of Villa Nova (2012–15); Auxiliary Bishop of Rome (2012–15)

Orders
- Ordination: 9 May 1981 by Renato Spallanzani
- Consecration: 14 April 2012 by Agostino Vallini
- Created cardinal: 5 October 2019 by Pope Francis
- Rank: Cardinal-Priest

Personal details
- Born: Matteo Maria Zuppi; 11 October 1955 (age 70) Rome, Italy
- Denomination: Catholic
- Education: Pontifical Lateran University; Sapienza University of Rome
- Motto: Gaudium Domini fortitudo vestra (The joy of the Lord is your strength)

- Coat of arms

Matteo Maria Zuppi ([matˈtɛːo maˈriːa tˈtsuppi, - dˈdzuppi]; born 11 October 1955) is an Italian Roman Catholic prelate who has served as Archbishop of Bologna since 2015. He was previously an auxiliary bishop of Rome from 2012 to 2015.

Pope Francis made him a cardinal in 2019. He has been president of the Episcopal Conference of Italy since 2022. During this time, Zuppi opposed right-wing populism, nationalism and anti-immigrant beliefs, emphasizing Europe's moral duty to welcome migrants. These views resulted in clashes with Matteo Salvini, leader of Italy's Lega Party, alongside other individuals of the Italian right. He was a voice of support for the 2018 Vatican-China Agreement, which allows the pope to approve and veto bishops approved by the Chinese Communist Party. He has written three books on Catholicism and additionally contributed an essay to the Italian translation of James Martin's Building a Bridge. As a close associate of Pope Francis, who supported many of his initiatives, Zuppi was seen as a leading contender in the 2025 papal conclave.

== Early life and priesthood ==
Born in Rome on 11 October 1955, he is the fifth of six children of the journalist Enrico Zuppi, and Carla Fumagalli (d. 2004), niece of Cardinal Carlo Confalonieri. He attended the Liceo Virgilio there and then he studied at the seminary in Palestrina and earned his Bachelor of Sacred Theology at the Pontifical Lateran University in Rome. He earned a laurea at the Sapienza University of Rome, writing his thesis on the history of Christianity. He was ordained a priest of the Diocese of Palestrina on 9 May 1981 and in that year was appointed as the parochial vicar of Basilica of Santa Maria in Trastevere under Vincenzo Paglia, whom he succeeded as pastor of the church, serving from 2000 to 2010. He was incardinated into the Archdiocese of Rome in 1988.

He worked with the Community of Sant'Egidio, a Catholic lay association devoted to ecumenism and conflict resolution. Zuppi was one of the four mediators of the two-year-long Rome-based peace negotiations that resulted in the Rome General Peace Accords and helped end the civil war in Mozambique in 1992, in recognition of which he was made an honorary citizen of that country. Zuppi also traveled to Turkey in 1993 in an attempt to secure the release of two Italian tourists held by Kurdish rebels.

== Bishop and archbishop ==
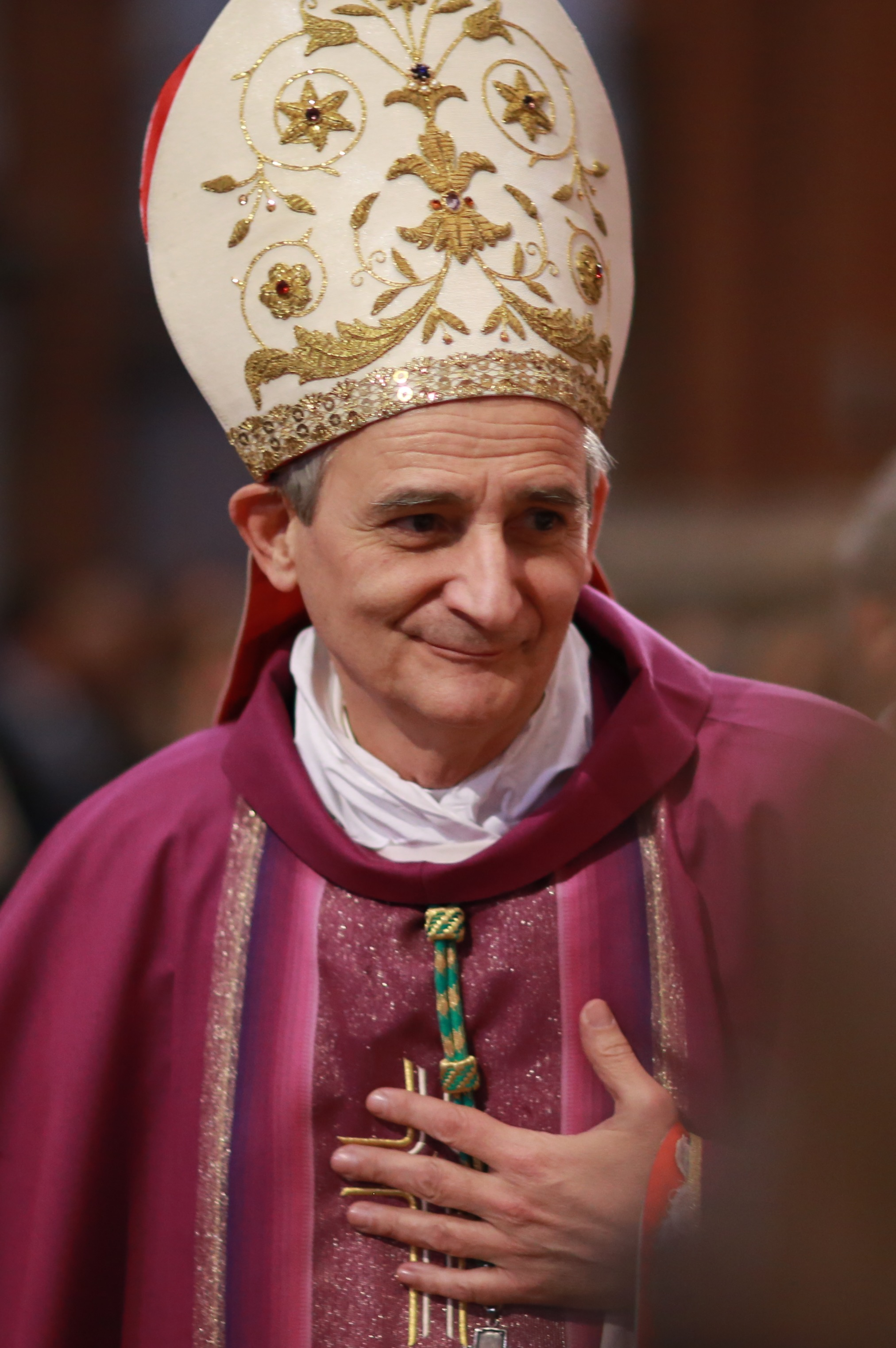
Zuppi as Archbishop of Bologna in 2015

On 31 January 2012, Pope Benedict XVI named him an Auxiliary Bishop of the Diocese of Rome and titular bishop of Villa Nova. He was ordained a bishop on 14 April 2012 by Cardinal Agostino Vallini, Vicar General of the Diocese of Rome. He was the auxiliary responsible for the city center, including the Trastevere neighborhood where Sant'Egidio is headquartered. There he led efforts to improve care for the poor and the elderly and developed outreach programs for drug addicts and Romani. He also established relations with traditionalists and celebrated a Pontifical Mass according to the Tridentine rite.

Pope Francis appointed him Archbishop of Bologna on 27 October 2015.

On 1 September 2019 Pope Francis announced that he planned to create Zuppi a cardinal on 5 October; he was the first head of an Italian see traditionally headed by a cardinal to be named a cardinal by Francis. On 5 October 2019, Pope Francis made him Cardinal-Priest of Sant'Egidio. He was made a member of the Dicastery for Promoting Integral Human Development on 21 February 2020, and a member of the Administration of the Patrimony of the Apostolic See on 18 April 2020.

On 14 January 2022, at the Basilica of St. Mary of the Angels and of the Martyrs in Rome, Zuppi presided over the state funeral of David Sassoli, his personal friend since adolescence and President of the European Parliament, who died on 11 January due to a multiple myeloma.

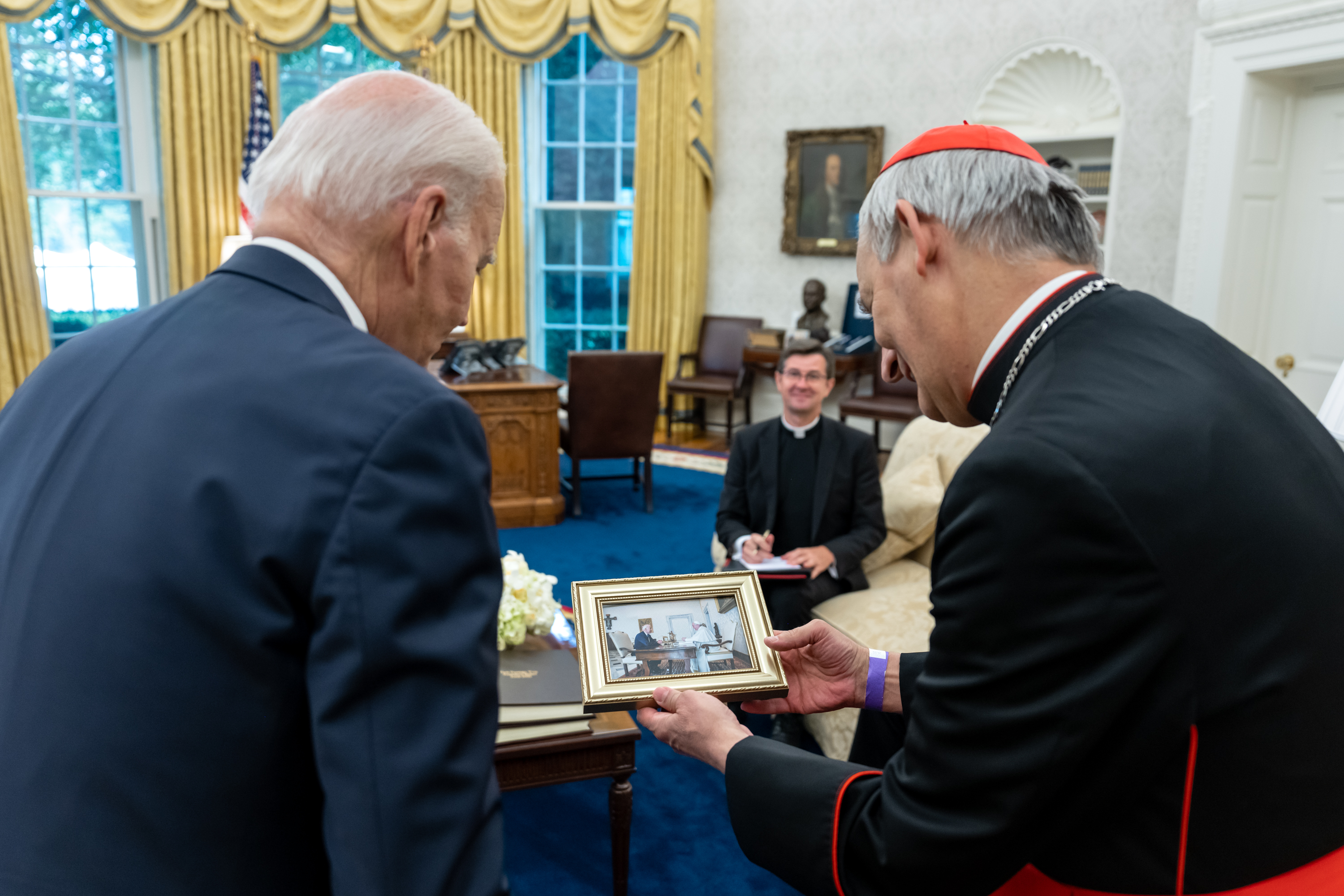
Zuppi with US President Joe Biden in 2023

On 24 May 2022, Pope Francis, having been presented by the Conference with three candidates for the post, chose Zuppi to serve a five-year term as president of the Episcopal Conference of Italy.

In June 2022 Cardinal Zuppi was accused of hiding what critics called blessing a gay couple after their civil wedding. The editor of the Italian conservative Catholic online newspaper said the Archdiocese of Bologna made a number of false claims in a statement attempting to justify the ceremony. The "blessing" of Pietro Morotti and Giacomo Spagnolli took place in the presence of six priests at the church of San Lorenzo di Budrio. Cardinal Zuppi was not present and had no part in the ceremony.

In 2023 Pope Francis asked Cardinal Zuppi to carry out a peace mission to try to help end the Russian invasion of Ukraine. Zuppi met President Volodymyr Zelenskyy; he did not meet President Vladimir Putin, but he did meet with Patriarch Kirill of Moscow. In July 2023, he flew to the United States to meet with President Joe Biden.

Cardinal Zuppi visited Moscow in October 2024 to promote humanitarian collaboration amid the ongoing conflict.

Cardinal Zuppi met again with Volodymyr Zelenskyy after the funeral of Pope Francis in April 2025 to discuss facilitating the return of Ukrainian children illegally deported from Russia as well as the release of prisoners.

In July 2026 he visited Ukraine again.

== Views ==
=== Sexuality ===
In May 2018, he contributed an essay to the Italian translation of James Martin's Building a Bridge, Un ponte da costruire. He wrote that it was "useful for encouraging dialogue, as well as reciprocal knowledge and understanding, in view of a new pastoral attitude that we must seek together with our LGBT brothers and sisters" and that it will "help LGBT. Catholics feel more at home in what is, after all, their church". In 2024 Zuppi defended Fiducia supplicans, explaining:

[The document] is set within the horizon of mercy, of the Church's loving gaze upon all God's children, without however departing from the teachings of the Magisterium. [...] God wants everyone to be saved. It is therefore the Church's duty to care for each and every one. We cannot forget that all the baptised enjoy the full dignity of "sons of God" and, as such, are our brothers and sisters. There is no questioning the meaning of the Sacrament of Marriage.

Zuppi does not exclude the possibility of making priestly celibacy optional, noting that there are already married priests within the Catholic hierarchy: "If you go to Ukraine or Romania, the priests of the Byzantine rite communities, but linked to Rome, are already there...so it is a discipline that can be changed."

=== Foreign policy ===
==== Vatican-China agreement ====
He also supports the 2018 Vatican-China Agreement, which allows the pope to approve and veto bishops approved by the Chinese Communist Party. As Francis' "personal peace envoy", Zuppi met with Chinese officials in regards to the Russian invasion of Ukraine and established "cordial" conversations with them.

==== Condemnation of nationalism in Europe ====
Zuppi has spoken vociferously against nationalism and for the benefits of pro-Europeanism, noting in March 2025 that "only a united Europe can preserve European humanism...Today the evil of nationalism wears new clothes...[and is] in contradiction with the Gospel." Zuppi has also emphasized the need to welcome migrants, exploring in his 2019 book Odierai il prossimo tuo come te stesso the root causes of the opposition to recent mass migration in Europe: fear, individualism, and an unwillingness to see the "Other" as one's brother. These views have often resulted in clashes with Matteo Salvini, leader of the right-wing populist Lega Party.

== Publications ==
- Zuppi, Matteo Maria (2010). La Confessione, il perdono per cambiare. Cinisello Balsamo: Edizioni San Paolo. ISBN 978-88-215-6821-3.
- Zuppi, Matteo Maria (2013). Guarire le malattie del cuore: itinerario quaresimale. Cinisello Balsamo: Edizioni San Paolo. ISBN 978-88-215-7649-2.
- Zuppi, Matteo Maria (2019). Odierai il prossimo tuo come te stesso. Perché abbiamo dimenticato la fraternità. Riflessioni sulle paure del tempo presente. Piemme. ISBN 978-8856672336.

== See also ==
- Cardinals created by Francis
- 2025 papal conclave

Catholic Church titles
Preceded by Anthony Francis Mestice	Titular Bishop of Villa Nova; 31 January 2012 – 27 October 2015	Succeeded by Mirosław Milewski
Preceded by Carlo Caffarra	Archbishop of Bologna; 27 October 2015 –	Incumbent
New title	Cardinal-Priest of Sant'Egidio; 5 October 2019 –	Incumbent
Preceded by Gualtiero Bassetti	President of the Italian Episcopal Conference; 24 May 2022 – present	Incumbent
