= Floribert Bwana Chui =

Congolese martyr and customs official (1981-2007)

Blessed Floribert Bwana Chui

Martyr
- Born: Floribèrt Bwana Chui bin Kositi; 13 June 1981; Goma, North Kivu, Zaire
- Died: 8 July 2007 (aged 26); Goma, North Kivu, Democratic Republic of the Congo
- Venerated in: Roman Catholic Church
- Beatified: 15 June 2025, Basilica of Saint Paul Outside the Walls, Rome, Italy by Cardinal Marcello Semeraro
- Feast: 8 July

Floribert Bwana Chui (13 June 1981 — 8 July 2007) was a Congolese customs worker who was murdered for refusing a bribe to allow the import of rancid rice from Rwanda into the Democratic Republic of the Congo. He was a member of the Community of Sant'Egidio and beatified by the Catholic Church on 15 June 2025.

== Life ==
=== Early life ===
Floribert Bwana Chui was born 13 June 1981 in Goma on the border of Rwanda. He received a degree in law and became a member of the Community of Sant'Egidio, a lay Catholic religious community which focuses on conflict resolution and service to the poor. After working in Kinshasa at the Office Congolais de Contrôle, he returned to Goma and worked at the customs office. In addition to his career, he was dedicated to serving street children.

=== Death ===
On 7 July 2007, he was offered a bribe to import rancid rice from Rwanda. Knowing that allowing the importation would have posed a threat for the health and life of the citizens, especially the weaker and poorer ones, he refused out of fidelity to his Catholic faith. In retaliation, he was kidnapped and tortured to death, succumbing to his injuries—including broken teeth, a broken arm, and an iron being pressed to his genitals and buttocks—on 8 July 2007. His body was discovered on 9 July.

== Beatification ==
On 25 November 2024, Pope Francis authorized the cause for the beatification of Floribert Bwana Chui as a martyr killed in hatred of the faith. This recognition was part of the late Pope's broader understanding of martyrdom as anyone killed for doing the work of God, even if not killed for being a Christian per se.

On 15 June 2025, Floribert Bwana Chui was beatified in a Mass presided over by Cardinal Marcello Semeraro, held in the Basilica of Saint Paul Outside the Walls. On 16 June 2025, Pope Leo XIV addressed a group of pilgrims from the Democratic Republic of the Congo, praising the newly beatified martyr's spirituality and encouraging the pilgrims to follow his example.
