= Sant'Egidio, Rome =

Sant'Egidio
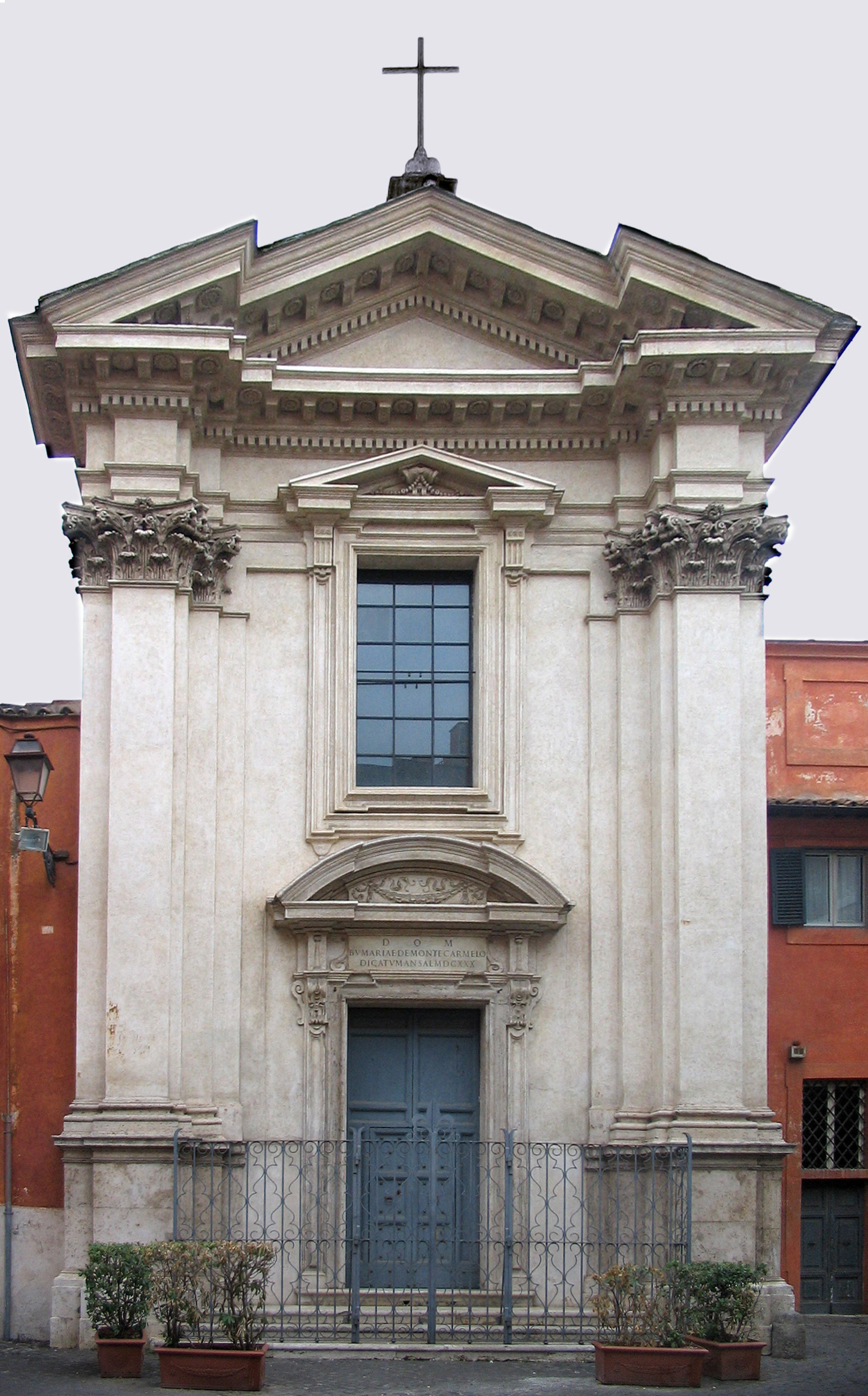
- The church of Sant'Egidio
- Click on the map for a fullscreen view
- 41°53′25″N 12°28′08″E
- Location: Trastevere, Rome
- Country: Italy
- Denomination: Roman Catholic

History
- Status: Titular church
- Dedication: St. Giles

Architecture
- Architectural type: Church
- Groundbreaking: 1630

Sant'Egidio is a convent church in Trastevere, Rome. Sant'Egidio (St. Giles) is the patron saint of hermits and people with disabilities.

The church was founded in 1630 and was abandoned by the nuns in 1971. In 1973, it was occupied by the Community of Sant'Egidio, which had been founded in 1968, and was still looking for a meeting place of its own. The community, which had not had a name before, then chose to name itself after its church.

Together with the adjacent former Carmelite monastery, the church forms the seat of the Community of Sant'Egidio.

It has been the titular church of Cardinal Matteo Zuppi since 5 October 2019.

== Notes and references ==
- Pierre Anouilh, "Des pauvres a la paix. Aspects de l'action pacificatrice de Sant'Egidio au Mozambique", _LFM. Sciences sociales et mmissions_, No.17, Dec. 2005, pp. 11–40
- Eric Morier-Genoud, "Sant’ Egidio et la paix. Interviews de Don Matteo Zuppi & Ricardo Cannelli", _LFM. Sciences sociales et mmissions_, Oct 2003, pp. 119–145
