= Enrico Zuppi =

Italian photographer and journalist (1909–1992)

- Born: 10 July 1909; Rome, Kingdom of Italy
- Died: 18 December 1992 (aged 83); Rome, Italy
- Occupations: Journalist; photographer
- Spouse: Carla Fumagalli (m. 1946)
- Children: 6, including Cardinal Matteo Zuppi

Enrico Zuppi (Rome, 10 July 1909 – Rome, 18 December 1992) was an Italian photographer and journalist, and father of Cardinal Matteo Zuppi.

== Life and career ==
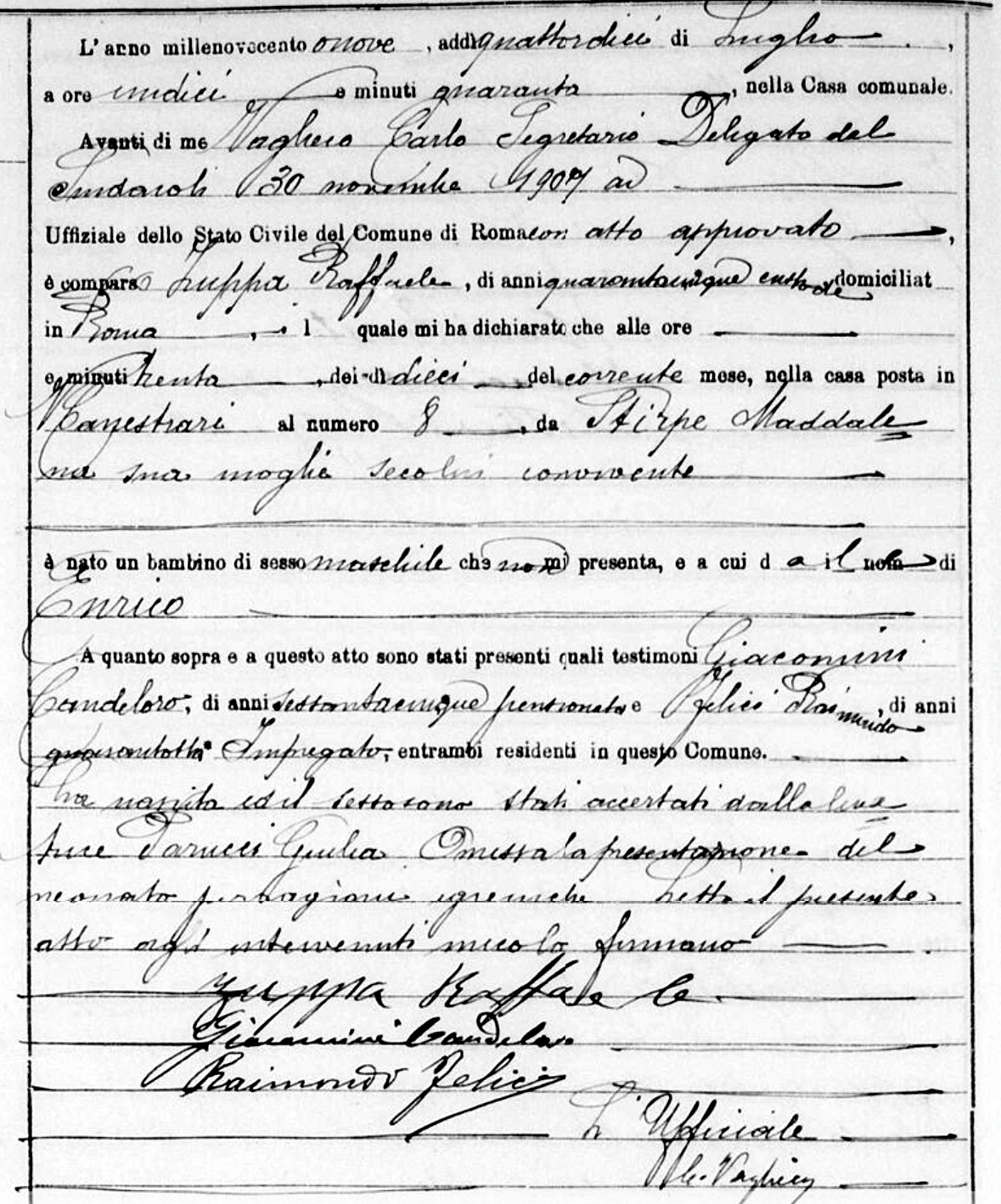
Birth Certificate of Enrico Zuppi

Enrico Zuppi was born on 10 July 1909 in Rome, son of Raffaele Zuppi, (Note: Raffaele Zuppi was born as 'Raffaele Zuppa', and was registered in son's birth document as such.) and Maddalena Stirpe. He had one younger brother, Vittorio (died young), and an elder sister, Rosa 'Rosina'. At a young age, he attended the Basilica of Sant'Eustachio. He belonged to the Italian Catholic Federation of University Students, where he met Giovanni Battista Montini, the future Pope Paul VI.

In the first years of his career, Zuppi worked at the Compagnia di San Paolo, in Assisi, as a photographer, creating advertisements and promotional photos for the Compagnia. Over 20,000 of his images were donated by his family to the Luigi Sturzo institute, and are conserved in the 'Fondo Enrico Zuppi'. After the second World War, Zuppi moved to Milan and Bologna, working with newspapers such as L'Italia, and L'Avvenire d'Italia, and with the latter worked along with Raimondo Manzini.

In January 1947, Zuppi was given the position of director of the Vatican City weekly newspaper, L'Osservatore della Domenica, by the then Secretary of State, Giovanni Montini (future Pope Paul VI). Zuppi modernised the newspaper, and when he went into retirement in 1979, the newspaper was reduced to 8 pages, before ceasing publications in 2007.

== Personal life ==
In 1946, Zuppi wed Carla Fumagalli (died 2005), the niece of Cardinal Carlo Confalonieri. The couple had six children, Giovanni Maria, Cecilia, Pier Luca, Marco, Matteo Maria, and Paolo.

Zuppi died in Rome on 18 December 1992, aged 83.
