= Religion and HIV/AIDS =

Relation between religious belief and HIV/AIDS

The relationship between religion and HIV/AIDS has been an ongoing one, since the advent of the pandemic. Many faith communities have participated in raising awareness about HIV/AIDS, offering free treatment, as well as promoting HIV/AIDS testing and preventative measures. Christian denominations, such as Lutheranism and Methodism, have advocated for the observance of World AIDS Day to educate their congregations about the disease. Some Churches run voluntary blood testing camps and counselling centers to diagnose and help those affected by HIV/AIDS.

Controversies, in some faiths, have mainly revolved around LGBT people and condom use, while other religions are affirming of LGBT individuals and actively participate in the dissemination of condoms as a means of disease prophylaxis.

== Religious attitudes towards HIV-positive people and AIDS ==
=== Christianity ===
Lutherans must confront stigmatization by approaching theological and scriptural interpretations with deep grace and a constant frame centered on people, not issues. Grace leads to compassionate community providing space for the whole life of someone living with HIV or AIDS. As Lutherans, we profess our faith as grounded in grace alone, therefore we are called to be a grace-filled church for the world. We must provide compassion, hospitality and dignity for people living with HIV, and talk about destigmatizing our perceptions specifically on how people contract HIV.

— Living Lutheran, a publication of the Evangelical Lutheran Church in America

Many Christian denominations and Christian charities provide services for people living with HIV/AIDS. One example is the "Drug Resources Enhancement against Aids and Malnutrition" (DREAM), program promoted by the Christian Community of Sant'Egidio.

The Evangelical Lutheran Church in America annually observes World AIDS Day to "remember all who have been and continue to be affected by HIV and AIDS" and "to raise awareness and recommit to a faithful and dedicated response." Lutherans have held conferences on being "catalysts for ending discrimination of people with HIV or AIDS through destigmatization". The United Evangelical Lutheran Churches in India runs voluntary blood testing camps and counselling centers to help those affected by HIV/AIDS. These outlets also "provide training for nurses and paramedical staff, distribute information to the villagers, host AIDS' awareness rallies, educational puppet shows and video documentaries about the disease."

The United Methodist Church teaches that individuals with HIV/AIDS should be welcomed and cared for; it supports ending discrimination against people living with the disease and supports education and awareness on HIV. To this end, Methodist churches have held conferences to achieve these aims, which included many church members receiving HIV testing to express solidarity with those affected with the human immunodeficiency virus.

The United Church of Christ (UCC), a Reformed denomination of the Congregationalist tradition, promotes the distribution of condoms in churches and faith-based educational settings to combat the pandemic.

Jerry Falwell regularly linked the AIDS pandemic to LGBT issues and stated, "AIDS is not just God's punishment for homosexuals, it is God's punishment for the society that tolerates homosexuals."

The Church of Jesus Christ of Latter-day Saints prohibits HIV-positive individuals from serving as church missionaries, unless the disease is in remission.

=== Islam ===
The question of Islam and AIDS has arisen in recent years as the HIV/AIDS epidemic has grown stronger, with awareness and efforts to prevent the spread of the disease. Many Muslims view the AIDS epidemic through what is called the "prism of sin", and as the consequence of sinful behavior, such as prostitution, sex with multiple partners, homosexuality, drug usage or promiscuity. Awareness of the HIV/AIDS epidemic is growing among the Muslim community and efforts are being initiated to prevent its spread. The Muslim Awareness Programme (MAP), based in South Africa is a faith-based organization that promotes HIV/AIDS prevention strategies based on the moral teachings of Islam. These activities include the promotion of abstinence from all sexual activity outside marriage; refraining from drug use, and instilling faithfulness within marriage. In their view, the Islamic position on morality, chastity and the sanctity of marriage needs to be shared with the world. Islam cites sex with multiple partners, sex outside marriage, other promiscuous sexual behaviors and homosexuality as immoral and as a result of this some Muslims consider this behavior the main cause of HIV/AIDS, believing that promoting abstinence and chasity is the key to ending or at least containing the epidemic.

=== Judaism ===
As opposed to the Catholic Church and some other denominations or religions, today, there isn't any central Jewish religious authority that is accepted by the vast majority of religious Jews and most Jewish religious movements.

Orthodox Judaism links between immoral sexual behavior and AIDS, with some deeming it a "mark of disgrace".. Immanuel Jakobovits, Baron Jakobovits, former Chief Rabbi of England, a prominent figure in 20th-century Jewish medical ethics maintains in his article "Halachic Perspectives on AIDS" that "... from my reading of Jewish sources, it would appear that under no circumstances would we be justified in branding the incidence of the disease (...) as punishment ... we have not the vision, that would enable us to link, as an assertion of certainty, any form of human travail, grief, bereavement or suffering in general with shortcomings of a moral nature... It is one thing to speak of a consequence, and it is quite another thing to speak of a punishment ... if you warn a child not to play with fire, lest he gets burnt, and the child then gets burnt, then the burning may not be a punishment for not listening, but it certainly is a consequence. ... I think we should declare in very plain and explicit terms indicating that our society violated some of the norms of the Divine Law, and of the natural law, and that as a consequence we pay a price, and an exceedingly heavy price. This certainly is Jewish doctrine ..."

Conservative and Reform Judaism emphasize the importance of bikur cholim, the responsibility to care for the sick:

"The United Synagogue of Conservative Judaism calls upon all of its congregations to reach out to individuals infected with the AIDS virus, their families and their friends by providing acceptance, comfort, counseling, and sympathetic and empathetic listening; and ... affirms that those infected with the AIDS virus must be protected from all forms of illegal discrimination, such as discriminatory housing, employment, health care delivery services and synagogue services." Rabbi Marla J. Feldman, Director of the Joint Commission on Social Action of the Union for Reform Judaism: "However, we must look past the incomprehensible statistics and long lists of facts and recognize the Divine image within the faces of the individual people infected and affected by this disease. The responsibility lies with each of us to protect and care for these victims ..."

== Prevention ==
=== Christianity ===
==== Catholicism ====
Pope John Paul II strongly opposed the use of artificial birth control, and rejected the use of condoms to prevent the spread of HIV. Pope Benedict XVI stated in 2005 that condoms were not a sufficient solution to the AIDS crisis, and then in 2009 claimed that AIDS "cannot be overcome through the distribution of condoms, which even aggravates the problems." The Moscow Patriarchate gave support to Benedict XVI's position. In response to Benedict XVI's statements, the United Church of Christ issued a statement encouraging condom distribution at places of worship.

On November 20, 2010, when questioned about the rampant HIV spread in Africa, Pope Benedict XVI suggested that the use of condoms in male prostitution is not a moral solution to stopping AIDS, but could represent a first step in assuming moral responsibility "in the intention of reducing the risk of infection." The Vatican City later clarified that the position of the Church on condom use has not changed. It is merely a statement that in homosexual relations, where unnatural contraception is not the main concern, condoms can be seen as moral responsibility in preventing HIV infections. On November 23, 2010, Benedict furthermore stated that the concept of condoms as a lesser evil in preventing HIV infections can be applied to women as well. The use of condoms is the first step in taking responsibility and attempting to prevent the infection of one's partner. The Pope does not say anything about condoms being acceptable as unnatural birth control, only as a responsible approach.

==== Lutheranism ====
The United Evangelical Lutheran Churches in India runs voluntary blood testing camps and counselling centers to diagnose and aid individuals that could have HIV/AIDS. These initiatives are aimed at helping individuals who speak an array of languages and have no access to public health centres. The Church has translated Grace, Care and Justice, a handbook published by the Lutheran World Federation, into Hindi, the official language of India, as well as the regional languages Tamil and Telugu, to disseminate information regarding the "prevention, transmission and care provision" of HIV/AIDS.

Teams from Lutheran World Relief provide healthcare to people affected by HIV/AIDs in Nairobi. Multiple months of drugs are provided to patients during their visits to Lutheran World Relief clinics.

==== Reformed ====
The United Church of Christ (UCC), a Reformed denomination of the Congregationalist tradition, promotes the distribution of condoms in churches and faith-based educational settings. Michael Shuenemeyer, a UCC minister, has stated that "The practice of safer sex is a matter of life and death. People of faith make condoms available because we have chosen life so that we and our children may live."

=== Buddhism ===
In Thailand, some Buddhist monks encourage the use of condoms for HIV prevention. As part of Mechai Viravaidya's pro-condom campaign, Buddhist monks have offered blessed condoms for couples.

== Treatment ==
At an ecumenical service, the World Council of Churches (WCC) issued a call to action focused on "reducing stigma and discrimination; increasing access to HIV services; defending human rights and ensuring testing and treatment for all, including children".

The Conference of Bishops of the Evangelical Lutheran Church in America were all tested for HIV/AIDS in order to raise awareness of the disease, and to promote testing for the pandemic. This has helped to reduce the stigma associated with HIV/AIDS. Teams from Lutheran World Relief provide healthcare to people affected by HIV/AIDs in Nairobi. Multiple months of drugs are provided to patients during their visits to Lutheran World Relief clinics. The Ministry Among People in Poverty (MAPP) Committee of the Evangelical Lutheran Church "encouraged all the bishops to support and be involved in local events on World AIDS Day, Dec. 1, including raising awareness about AIDS prevention, testing, treatment, care, stigma and discrimination." 93.1% of clergy, a study found, were willing to share their knowledge about HIV/AIDS with their church congregations.

Other Christian churches, such as the Lutheran Church and the United Church of Christ, actively distribute HIV/AIDS medication and promote HIV/AIDS testing, as well as prevention.

According to the African Health Policy Network, the Synagogue Church Of All Nations led by televangelist Temitope Balogun Joshua, has encouraged individuals to cease taking HIV medication and solely rely on faith healing to cure the disease; the Hackney-based Centre for the Study of Sexual Health and HIV reports that several people have stopped taking their medication leading to a number of deaths. The Synagogue Church Of All Nations advertise an "anointing water" to promote God's healing, although the group deny advising people to stop taking medication.
