= Villa Nova, Mauritania =

Suppressed see of the Roman Catholic Church

Mauretania Caesariensis.

The Diocese of Villanova (Latin: Dioecesis Villanovensis) is a suppressed and titular see of the Roman Catholic Church.

In antiquity the seat of the bishopric was in a Roman town of the Roman province of Mauretania Caesariensis. That civitas has now been lost to history though it was undoubtedly in modern Algeria.

Christianity came late to the province of Mauritania Cesariense, and like most bishoprics from there, Villa Nova only comes into the historic records after the Council of Nicaea. The only known bishop of this diocese is Balente, who took part in the synod assembled in Carthage in 484 by the Arian King Huneric of the Vandal Kingdom, after which Balente was exiled, possibly to Sicily.

The diocese seems to have effectively continued till some time after the Muslim conquest of the Maghreb and today Villanova survives as a titular bishopric and the current bishop-owner is Mirosław Milewski, auxiliary bishop of Płock, who replaced Matteo Zuppi of Bologna in 2015.
