= Drug Resource Enhancement against Aids and Malnutrition =

AIDS therapy program in Africa

DREAM (short for "Drug Resources Enhancement against Aids and Malnutrition", formerly "Drug Resource Enhancement against AIDS in Mozambique") is an AIDS therapy program promoted by the Christian Community of Sant'Egidio. The Community of Sant'Egidio, based in Rome, was formerly involved in the peace talks in Mozambique, facilitating the eleven rounds of negotiations in Rome that helped to end the Mozambican Civil War. The Community has worked closely with both the Mozambican Ministry of Health and the United States' PEPFAR in order to implement the DREAM program. The DREAM program is designed to give access to free ARV treatment with generic HAART drugs to the poor in Africa on a large scale: So far, 5,000 people are receiving ARV treatment, especially in Mozambique, but the program is being built up also in other countries, including Angola, Cameroon, Democratic Republic of Congo, Eswatini, Guinea, Kenya, Malawi, Nigeria and Tanzania. Despite being free, the program aims at excellence in treatment, providing the best existent range of drugs (HAART) and regular blood testing according to European standards. It is linked with a nutrition program as well as guidance and sanitary education by volunteers (other HIV patients taking part in the program), which encourages new patients to comply and come to the appointments. The compliance rate is very high (94 percent). The annual cost per person and year of the program is $800.

== See also ==
- HIV/AIDS in Africa
- Catholic Church and AIDS and Religion and AIDS
