= Milošević-Rugova education agreement =

1996 treaty

- Signed: 1 September 1996
- Location: Belgrade and Priština, Republic of Serbia
- Amendment: Agreed measures for the implementation of the agreement on education, 23 April 1998
- Mediators: Community of Sant'Egidio
- Original signatories: Slobodan Milošević; Ibrahim Rugova

The Milošević–Rugova education agreement was an agreement signed on 1 September 1996 between Slobodan Milošević, president of the Republic of Serbia, and Ibrahim Rugova, the first President of Kosovo, still an unrecognised state declared independent in secret by members of Kosovo's former assembly when Kosovo was within Yugoslavia. The negotiations were mediated by the Community of Sant'Egidio.

== Background ==
The decisions of the parliament of the Republic of Serbia in 1989 and the new constitution of the Republic of Serbia adopted in 1990 centralized education in Serbia and transferred all disputes over curricula and financing of education from the Serbian provinces of Vojvodina and Kosovo to the Ministry of Education of the Republic of Serbia. The representatives of Kosovo Albanians opposed this and continued to insist on organization of education on Kosovo according to curricula based on previous legislation and the former 1974 Yugoslav Constitution. Initially, the Ministry of Education of Serbia issued warnings to Kosovo Albanian teachers, without any result as they continued to ignore new legislation and curricula. The Kosovo Albanians insisted that nobody outside Kosovo can know better than they do how to educate their children. The content of curricula was not yet in dispute, but only the authority which held power of approval.

A parallel educational system was established in Kosovo for Kosovo Albanian children. The Kosovo Albanian teachers followed curricula adopted in August 1990 and some of them organized education in improvised schools, in tea houses, garages, and private houses, using formal documents with the stamp of the unrecognized Republic of Kosovo. However, according to Federal Minister of Education Ivan Ivić, most of them continued to use public government school buildings.

The Serbian Government reacted with suspension of financing of education in the Albanian language. This education obtained continuing financing from the Government of the Republic of Kosovo in exile, from foreign charities, and from the Kosovo Finance Board which collected an obligatory 3% taxes from companies in Kosovo.

== Negotiations ==
There were many attempts to negotiate a resolution of this issue through mediation by diplomats and emissaries who dealt with Yugoslavia, including Lord Owen, Thorvald Stoltenberg, Tadeusz Mazowiecki and Elisabeth Rehn, all without success. In 1996 the new school year was to start on 1 September 1996. The PPK published their suggestion to re-occupy school buildings using non violent means.

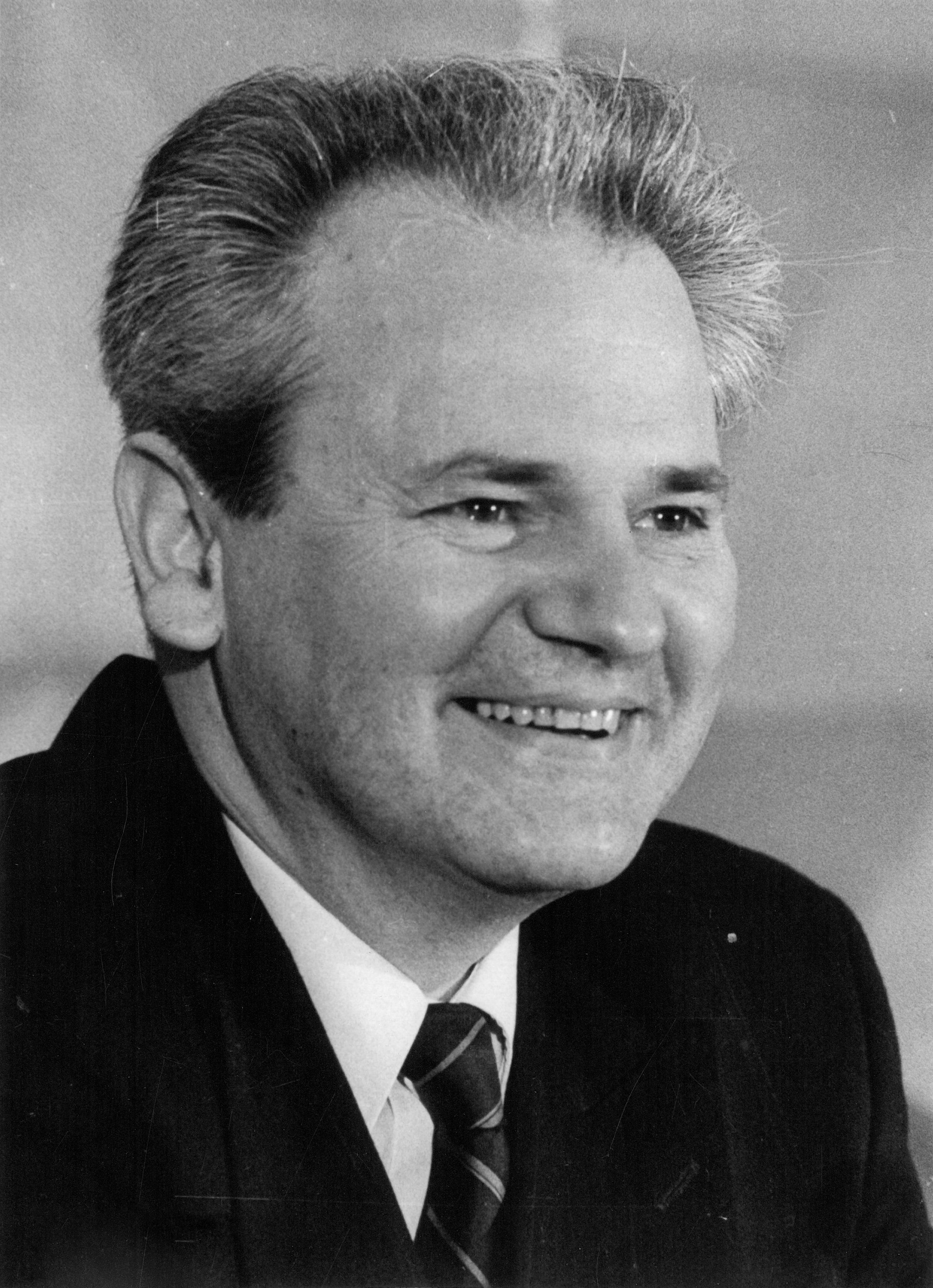
Slobodan Milošević took over the negotiations after the educational issue became politically important

Since this issue had political importance, the negotiations were taken over by the president of Serbia Slobodan Milošević and president of the unrecognized Kosovo Ibrahim Rugova.

== Agreement ==
The text of the agreement, mediated by the Italian group Community of Sant'Egidio, consisted of nine sentences. According to the agreement, Kosovo Albanian children will again attend school in state school buildings listed in an annex to the agreement. The annex contained a list of more than one hundred primary, secondary, and post-secondary schools and faculties. However, the agreement did not stipulate whether the Kosovo Albanian children were to be taught according to curricula of Serbia or not, which was the basic issue and reason for Kosovo Albanians not allowing their children to attend lectures in the public school buildings.

== Reactions ==
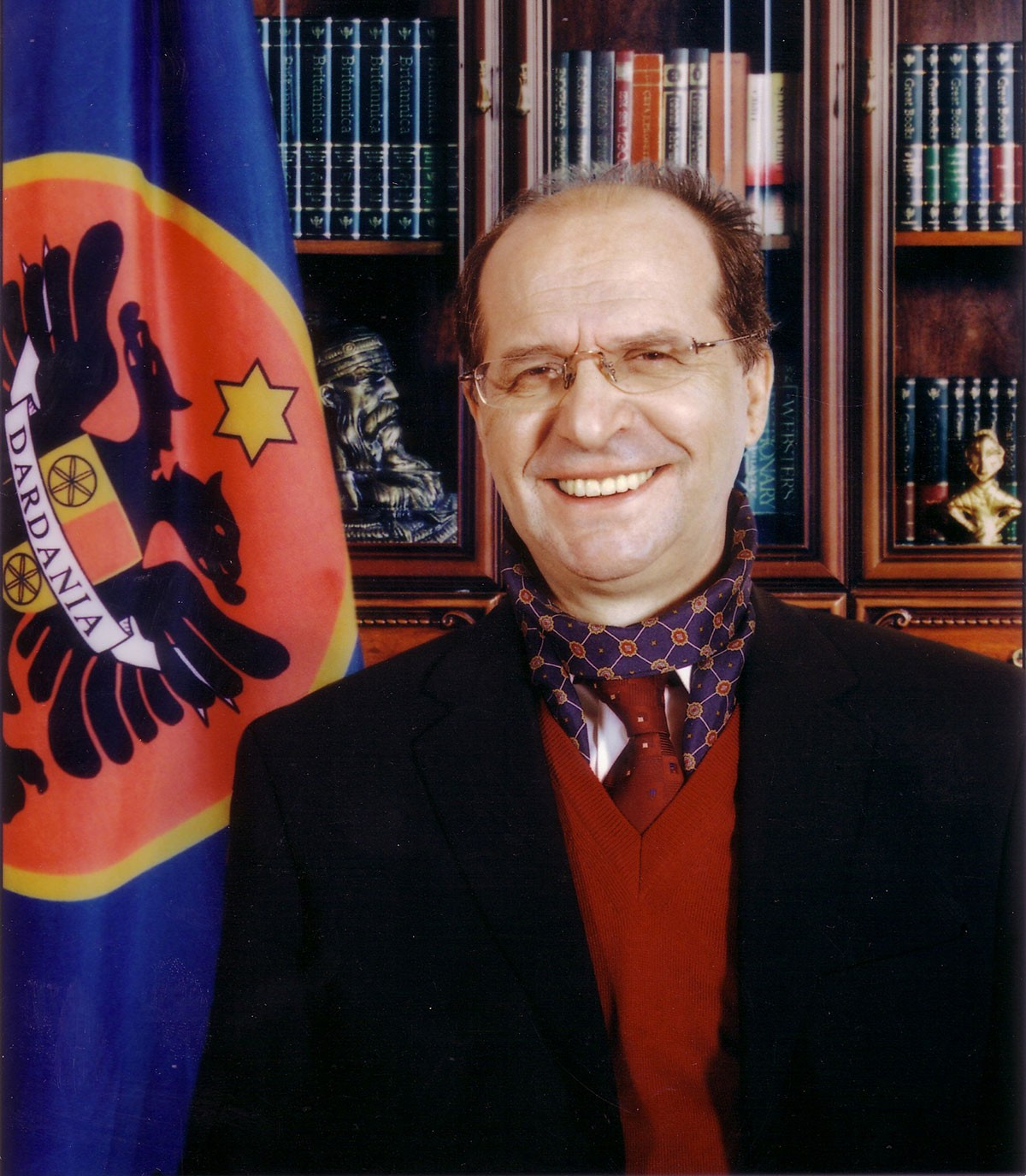
Ibrahim Rugova, recognized as legitimate leader of Kosovo Albanians by Slobodan Milošević

The political representatives of Kosovo Serbs were opposed to the agreement and criticized Milošević and his signing of the agreement. According to Momčilo Trajković, Milošević concluded the agreement "behind the back of Serbs making actions which stunned Serbs who are suffering and deceived". The CNN news network in the US saw the agreement as a precedent which legitimized the leading political organization of Kosovo Albanians and their leader Ibrahim Rugova.

For Milošević, this agreement elegantly proved that Kosovo Albanians are ready to negotiate with him and also that he was ready to negotiate with their leaders. Rugova was surprised that the agreement recognized him as leader of Kosovo Albanians, although the agreement referred to him only with his PhD title, without any mention of his title of "President of Kosova".

== Aftermath ==
On 23 April 1998 another agreement was signed by the representatives of the Republic of Serbia and Kosovo Albanians for implementation of the agreement on education signed between Milošević and Rugova in 1996.

== Sources ==
- Henry, H. Perritt Jr. (2010). The Road to Independence for Kosovo: A Chronicle of the Ahtisaari Plan. Cambridge University Press. ISBN 978-0-521-11624-4.
- Kola, Paulin (2003). The Search for Greater Albania. C. Hurst & Co. Publishers. ISBN 978-1-85065-664-7.
- Clark, Howard (2000). Civil resistance in Kosovo. Pluto Press. ISBN 978-0-7453-1574-4.
