= Mutual monogamy =

Mutual monogamy is a form of monogamy that exists when two partners agree to be sexually active with only one another. Being in a long-term mutually monogamous relationship reduces the risk of acquiring a sexually transmitted infection (STI). It is considered a reliable method to reduce the risk of STIs when both partners are uninfected and remain exclusive. Those who choose mutual monogamy can be tested before the sexual relationship to be certain they are not infected. This strategy for the prevention of acquiring a sexually transmitted infection requires that each partner remain faithful and does not engage in sexual activity with another partner.

Mutual monogamy differs from serial monogamy which is a current monogamous relationship that has not been established in the past and may not continue into the future. Serial monogamy may not result in the reduced risk of contracting a sexually transmitted infection because the past sexual exposures to infection are brought into the new relationship, even though it may be exclusive of other sexual partners. The risk of acquiring a sexually transmitted infection while in a serial monogamous relationship is the same as the risk of those who have concurrent partners. Those with a greater ability to communicate about their commitment are likely to sustain the relationship. When individuals are mutually monogamous, and are free from STIs/HIV when they enter the relationship, the risk for being infected with STI/HIV acquisition from sexual intercourse is very low. A mutually monogamous relationship lowers the risk of HIV, cervicitis, and other sexually transmitted infections.

Mutual monogamous relationships often involve commitments to exclusivity and long-term partnership, supported by psychological attachment. If these conditions remain a priority for both, the "couple is likely committed and mutually monogamous."

Being in a long-term mutually monogamous relationship with a partner who has been tested and has negative STI test lowers the chance of acquiring gonorrhea. It is also effective for lowering the risk of syphilis, chlamydia and pubic lice.

The lack of a more precise definition of mutual monogamy in the literature confounds the ability to statistically assess its effectiveness.
