= Community of Sant'Egidio =

Lay Catholic association dedicated to social service

- Comunità di Sant'Egidio
- Named after: Saint Giles
- Formation: 1968; 58 years ago
- Founder: Andrea Riccardi
- Founded at: Virgil High School, Rome
- Type: International association of the faithful of pontifical right; NGO
- Purpose: Care for the needy; arbitrate conflicts
- Headquarters: Sant'Egidio, Rome
- Location: 73 countries
- Region served: Europe, Africa, America, Asia
- Members: Worldwide
- President: Marco Impagliazzo
- Parent organization: Catholic Church
- Volunteers: 50,000 (estimate)
- Website: santegidio.org

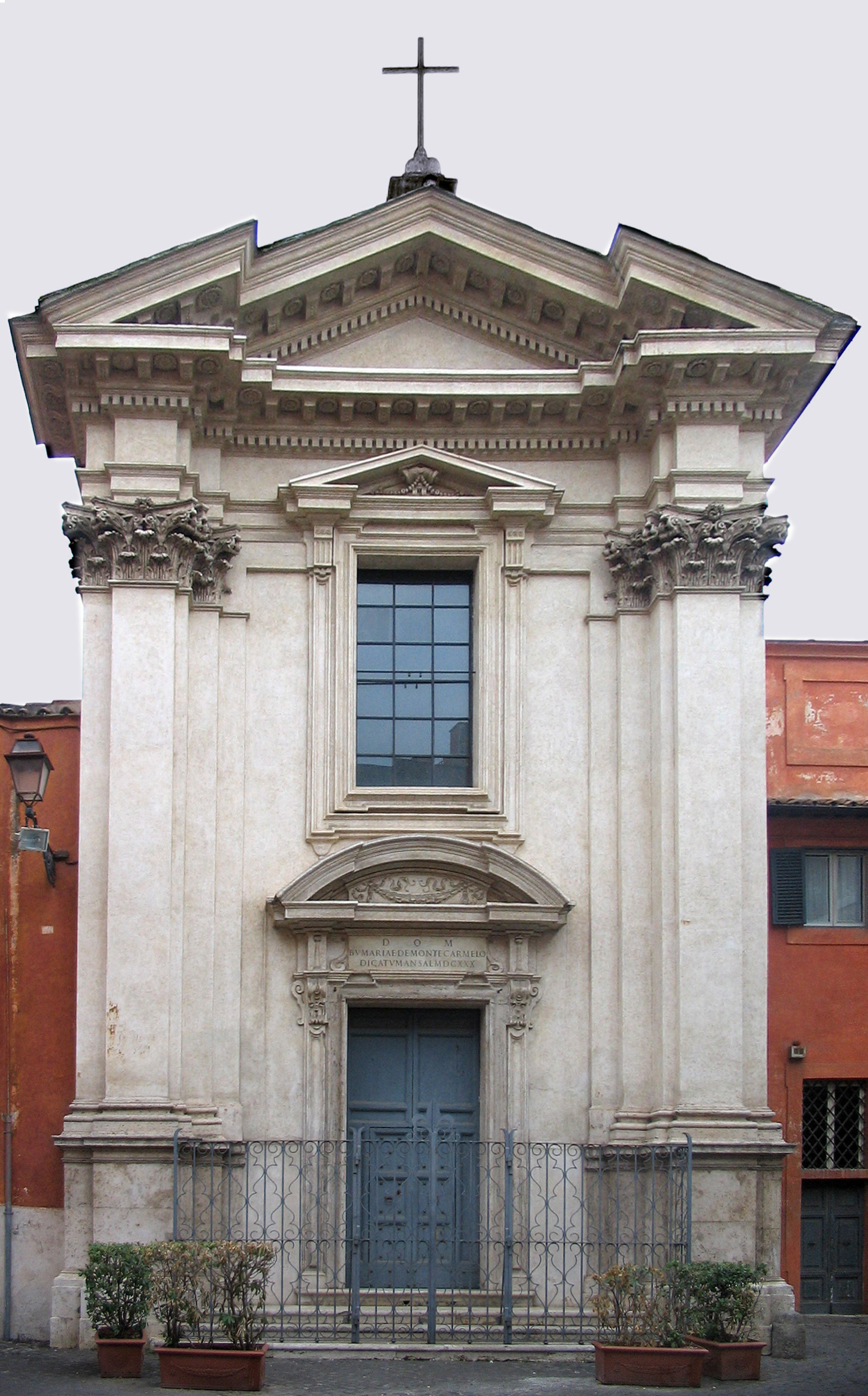
Church of Sant'Egidio, Rome, seat of the Community

The Community of Sant'Egidio (Italian: Comunità di Sant'Egidio) is a lay Catholic association dedicated to social service, founded in 1968 under the leadership of Andrea Riccardi. The group grew and in 1973 was given a home at the former Carmelite monastery and church of Sant'Egidio in Rome, Italy. In 1986, it received recognition from the Roman Curia of the Holy See as an international association of the faithful. Its activities include the Church's evening prayer together daily as a stimulus for lending assistance to a whole spectrum of needy persons: "lonely and non-self-sufficient elderly, immigrants and homeless people, terminally ill and HIV/AIDS patients, children at risk of deviance and marginalization, nomads and the physically and mentally handicapped, drug addicts, victims of war, and prisoners." The community also has a high profile in the area of peace negotiations, in addressing the AIDS epidemic in Africa, and in its opposition to capital punishment. It takes an ecumenical approach in all of its work.

Sant'Egidio is a network of small communities of fraternal life, currently present in 73 countries distributed as follows: Europe (23), Africa (29), Asia (7), North America (8), South America (5), Australia (2). There are an estimated 50,000 members.

== History ==
In 1968, just after the Second Vatican Council, Andrea Riccardi while still a teenager drew together a group of students at Virgil High School in Rome, and founded the Christian community of the Acts of the Apostles and Francis of Assisi. The students took to teaching poor children who lived in shacks in the Roman periphery. Then the Popular School was formed, now called the School of Peace and present in many countries of the world.

In 1973, the group acquired its present headquarters at the former Carmelite convent and church of Sant'Egidio (Italian for Saint Giles) in Trastevere in Rome. From 1977, the Community of Sant'Egidio expanded to other Italian cities, and in the 1980s it spread to Europe, Africa, America, and Asia. On 18 May 1986, the Pontifical Council for the Laity named the Community of Sant'Egidio as "an international association of the faithful of pontifical right".

In the Community of the nineties, the Country of the Rainbow was born, a movement for children and young people to learn respect for others and for nature. It can lead to a lifetime commitment in the Community. Also, the 1989 murder of a South African refugee was the stimulus for the People of Peace initiative directed primarily toward migrants but including the poor and elderly in some of its programs.

Pope Francis' closeness to the community was demonstrated when in July 2019 he appointed Mateo Bruni, a prominent member of the Sant' Egidio community, as Director of the Press Office of the Holy See. In October of the same year he raised to the Cardinalate Archbishop Matteo Zuppi of Bologna, a key member of the community in peace negotiations during the Mozambican Civil War.

== Governance ==
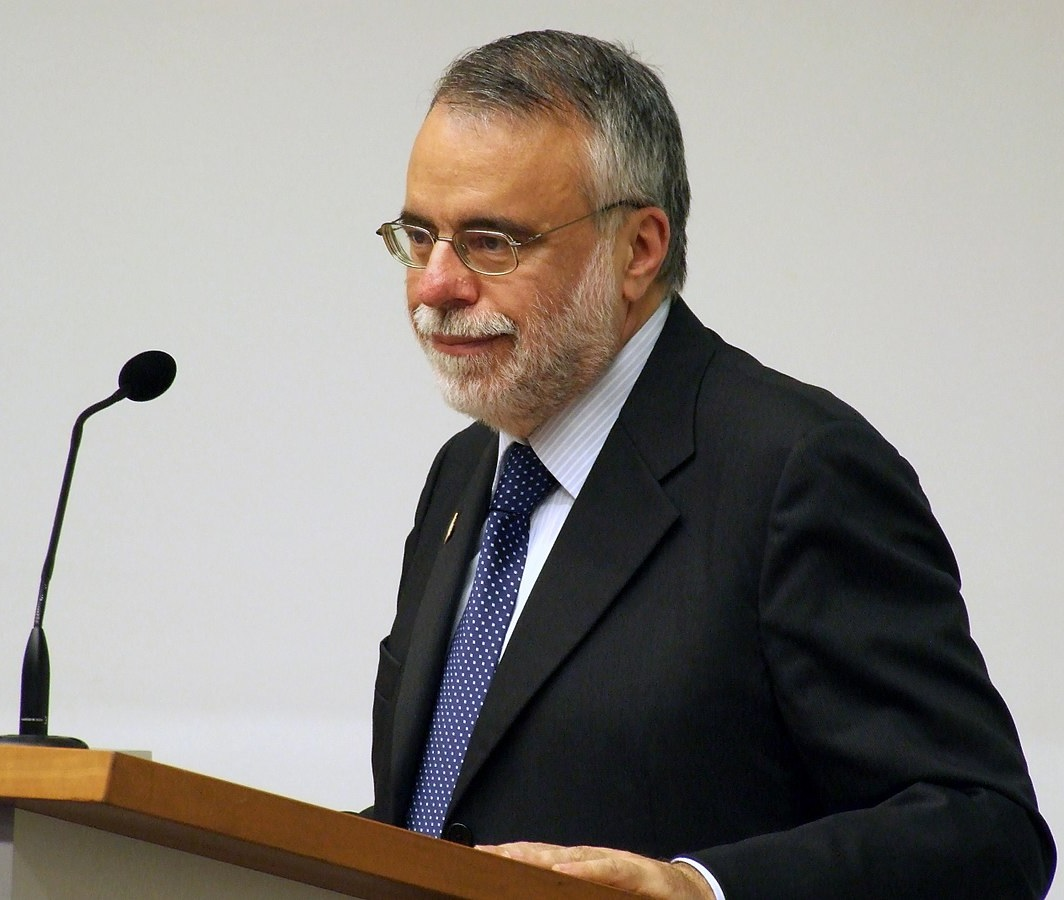
Andrea Riccardi, founder

The Community has no initiation ceremony or clear definition of membership. There are no salaried positions for Sant'Egidio officers, and all have outside jobs. Groups are held together by shared evening prayer and commitment to serve the poor. The number of those belonging to Sant'Egidio can only be estimated. The Pontifical Council for the Laity in its Compendium of International Movements estimated a membership of 50,000 in 2006.

Every four years, an election council consisting of about 40 representatives elects the president and a council as a guiding organ. In 2003, Marco Impagliazzo was named president of the Community, and remained in office through 2019. There is also a spiritual general assistant.

- World President: in charge of all the communities of Sant'Egidio worldwide (Rome, Italy).
- National President: responsible for all the communities in a country;
- President of the community (centres): head of the community building, responsible for organising charity events, activities, solidarity programs;
- Volunteers: people who join in for evening prayer, leading to befriending and helping the poor and needy.

The National President and the Council of Presidency are elected every five years by the General Assembly of representatives of all nuclei of communities (if there are several communities in a country).

== Activities ==
=== Prayer ===
The basis of its communal life is common evening prayer, which is open and may take place in a central church. At every service a Bible passage is interpreted as a stimulus for closer following of Jesus through forming friendships with the poor and working for peace among all peoples. The Community's effectiveness in working with people has been attributed to its "spirit of compromise and encounter", which has been compared to that of Pope Francis who has raised its profile during his pontificate. Francis, during a visit to the community in Rome on 14 June 2014, characterized the Community of Sant'Egidio with three Ps: preghiera, poveri, pace (prayer, poor, peace). On the occasion of its 50th anniversary celebrations, Francis again visited the community and remarked that it was a daughter of the Second Vatican Council, with its impulse to community life and to being The People of God. He also commended the community for its audacious love:

Audaciousness is not the courage of a day, it is the patience of a daily mission in the city and in the world, a mission to patiently weave together again the human fabric of the peripheries that violence and impoverishment have torn apart; a mission to communicate the Gospel through personal friendship; to show how life truly becomes human when it is lived beside the poor; a mission to create a society that considers no one a foreigner. It is the mission to cross borders and walls, to join together.

The Community, then, consists of small groups whose prayer together leads them outward to the poor and needy with whom they cultivate Christlike friendships. "Former Archbishop of Canterbury Lord Carey commented that the Community of Sant'Egidio is what we want the modern church to be."

=== Social commitment ===
Social commitment, especially through personal relationships, is what the Community of Sant'Egidio calls "friendship with the poor". Riccardi has described this friendship as so close that "I can't say that there is really a radical difference between members and non-members." Sant'Egidio has been described as a realization of Pope Francis' dream for the church to be "a field hospital" with Catholics "like shepherds living with the smell of their sheep". This includes the following.

==== Children and adolescents ====
In Schools of Peace values of humanity, peace, and coexistence on the basis of the Christian faith are taught, along with school promotion (e.g. homework support), common games, and excursions. Country of the Rainbow educates children to solidarity with all peoples and with nature. By 2019, it had grown to include about 10,000 children and young adults worldwide.

==== The elderly ====
Long Live the Elderly is an outreach program to the elderly in response to their isolation. The priority objective is prevention, fighting the negative effects of critical events (like heat waves, flu epidemics, falls, loss of cohabitant). Members of the Community establish long-term relationships with the lonely poor in rest homes, and find that "prayer and friendship with the poor is a beautiful way to live God's love and mercy in our daily life."

==== The homeless and needy ====
Community members serve meals to the poor. Worship and commemoration events are designed to strengthen ties to people suffering from homelessness and poverty. The Vatican may go to the Community when requests for food are made, as by North Korea.

The community in Rome prints a 253-page handbook titled Where to Eat, Sleep, and Wash in Rome as a gift for the homeless. The book lists places where service is offered for the estimated 7,500 people living on the streets or in makeshift shacks of Rome, including everything from 47 overnight shelters to the 11 language schools for migrants run by Sant'Egidio itself. Another of its works is with about 140,000 gypsies in Italy, as publicized by the Pontifical Council for the Pastoral Care of Migrants and Itinerant People.

==== Refugees and new citizens ====
The Language and Culture School offers free language courses and an introduction to the culture of the host country in various European countries. Refugees and new citizens launched the People of Peace movement in 1999 in various European countries with the aim of promoting integration, encounter of cultures and religions, exchange, and peace work in the respective countries. In 2016, in collaboration with the Italian Protestant churches, an agreement was signed with the Italian Government to set up the Humanitarian corridors project, whereby refugees from camps in Lebanon, Morocco, and Ethiopia can safely travel to Europe with humanitarian visas and avoid the dangerous trips across the sea. Pope Francis has turned to Sant'Egidio to house refugees brought to Italy by the Vatican.

==== People with disabilities ====
This offers spiritual exchange, religious education, and leisure activities for adults with disabilities, and reaches out to lepers. The Friends movement is a Community-sponsored restaurant that supports the DREAM program for AIDS sufferers in Africa by selling disabled peoples' paintings from the Community's own workshop.

==== Peace work ====
Sant'Egidio has been involved in numerous successful peace negotiations as a facilitator or observer: Albania (1987, elections), Mozambique (1989–1992, peace treaty), Algeria (1995, unify political groups), Guatemala (1996, mediate civil war), Kosovo (1996–1998, negotiate with Serbia), Congo (1999, national dialogue), Burundi (1997–2000, peace treaty). The Community's most significant diplomatic achievement was the mediation of the Peace Agreement for Mozambique on 4 October 1992, which ended a sixteen-year civil war. The Washington Post has described Sant'Egidio as "one of the most influential conflict resolution groups in the world," and this is borne out by the accolades it has received from a wide range of leaders. In 2002, the Community gathered 450 religious leaders to discuss forming an International Parliament of Religions to mobilise morality.

In 2014 Sant'Egidio collaborated with the Islamic association Muhammadiyah of Indonesia to bring an end to a 40-year conflict in the Mindanao region of the Philippines. Troubled areas where it was involved in 2017 included Central African Republic, Senegal, South Sudan, and Libya. In June of that year the UN Department of Political Affairs formally opened a channel of communication with Sant'Egidio, as have individual countries.

Members of the Community of Sant'Egidio have been organizing annual International Peace Meetings since their first at Assisi in 1986: Lyon (France) 2005, United States in 2006, Barcelona in 2010, Munich in 2011, Sarajevo in 2012, Rome in 2013, Antwerp in 2014, Tirana in 2015, and Assisi again in 2016, on the 30th anniversary of the first meeting. In 2017 the meeting took place in Münster and Osnabrück, with the participation of Chancellor Angela Merkel. There is a strong element of ecumenism and dialogue at these "annual meetings ... [that] bring together Muslims, Catholics, Jews, Christians of all faiths, humanists, non-believers."

Sant'Egidio has generated Youth for Peace groups, with some communicating through postings on websites. Members of the adult Peace People group support reception centers for foreigners and also reach out to the poor and elderly.

==== DREAM program ====
Sant'Egidio is "among global leaders on HIV/AIDS." Its program DREAM (Drug Resource Enhancement against AIDS and Malnutrition) is one of the most studied approaches to HIV / AIDs treatment in the world. with a reported 100 or so papers on the program. Many of these are peer-reviewed studies that attest to its efficacy.

DREAM takes a holistic approach, combining highly active antiretroviral therapy (HAART) with the treatment of malnutrition, tuberculosis, malaria, and sexually transmitted diseases, while emphasising health education at all levels. The program was initiated in Mozambique in March 2002 and has spread to Angola, Cameroon, Congo DRC, Kenya, Malawi, Mozambique, Nigeria, Tanzania, Guinea and Swaziland; it works through dispersed health centers. Funding has come from various international organizations including the World Bank and the Bill & Melinda Gates Foundation, as well as from Italy's wine growers. In 2004 Sant'Egidio received the Balzan Prize for humanity, peace and brotherhood among peoples, "and in particular for the realization of its DREAM program to fight AIDS and malnutrition that is taking place in Mozambique, a concrete model for others African countries in difficulty." In August 2020, the Community of Sant'Egidio in collaboration with the charity Children Do Matter started the construction of The Green Lotus, an orphanage and shelter for homeless young girls in Blantyre, Malawi.

==== Action to abolish the death penalty ====
Since 1998, the Community has been campaigning for a worldwide moratorium on the capital punishment. An appeal that was signed by more than 5 million people worldwide in 2007, in collaboration with the World Coalition Against the Death Penalty (WCADP), helped the United Nations General Assembly to pass by a large majority on 18 December 2007, a resolution which calls for a moratorium worldwide. Mario Marazziti, a member of the Community and of the lower house of parliament in Italy, head of its Human Rights Committee, published an English-language book entitled 13 Ways of Looking at the Death Penalty.

Every year since 2002, the Community of Sant'Egidio organises the Global Day of Action Cities for Life / Cities Against the Death Penalty on 30 November, inviting cities around the world to take part in the Cities for Life Day. It also shows its commitment against the death penalty by furnishing pen pals for many death-row convicts and by collecting signatures for a moratorium on executions.

=== Criticism ===
In 2003, the Italian journalist Sandro Magister wrote that working groups within Sant'Egidio, along with the poor, can displace the birth family for some Community members. He also printed a former member's memoir of having to defend one's behaviour or beliefs before executive members.

== Notable members ==
- Floribert Bwana Chui, the first member of the community to be beatified.
- Matteo Bruni, director of the Holy See Press Office of the Roman Curia.
- Mario Giro, former Italian Deputy Minister of Foreign Affairs and International Cooperation.
- Matteo Zuppi, Cardinal-Archbishop of Bologna.

== Awards ==
The Community of Sant'Egidio and its leaders have received numerous honours. These include:

- 1997: World Methodist Peace Award from the World Methodist Council
- 1999: Niwano Peace Prize from the Niwano Peace Foundation
- 1999: Félix Houphouët-Boigny Peace Prize from UNESCO
- 2002: Nominated by Parliament of Italy and American Friends Service Com. for Nobel Peace Prize
- 2004: International Peacemaking Award from Common Ground
- 2004: Balzan Prize for humanity, peace and brotherhood among peoples, and in particular for its DREAM program
- Science Prize of the University of Aquila 2004 for the DREAM project
- 2009: International Charlemagne Prize recognizing Andrea Riccardi, the Society's founder, as a "great European" whose life has been at the service of his neighbor
- Award of the Chirac Foundation for conflict prevention: awarded in 2010 to Mario Giro "for his work with the Community of Sant'Egidio"
- Disarmament Archive Journalist Award – Golden Doves for Peace, awarded in 2016 as part of the XXXII edition of the event, for the Humanitarian Corridors project
- Interfaith Center of New York founder's award for 2017, for humanitarian service

== See also ==
- Drug Resources Enhancement against Aids and Malnutrition (DREAM)
- Milošević-Rugova education agreement

== Bibliography ==
- Anouilh, Pierre. "Des pauvres a la paix. Aspects de l'action pacificatrice de Sant'Egidio au Mozambique". _ LFM. Sciences sociales et missions _, No.17, Dec. 2005, 11–40.
- Anouilh, Pierre. "UNESCO: The Rise of the "Peace Brokers" of the Community of Sant'Egidio". Chapter 5 in Faget, Jacques (28 April 2011). Mediation in Political Conflicts: Soft Power or Counter Culture?. Bloomsbury Publishing. ISBN 9781847316431
- Bartoli, Andrea. "Catholic Peacemaking: the experience of the Community of Sant'Egidio". Address at the US Institute of Peace Workshop, 5 February 2001.
- Morier-Genoud, Eric. "Sant' Egidio et la paix. Interviews de Don Matteo Zuppi & Ricardo Cannelli". _ LFM. Sciences sociales et missions _, Oct 2003, 119–145.

=== Books ===
- Banchoff, Thomas F. Religious pluralism, globalization, and world politics. US: Oxford U, 2008. https://books.google.com/books?id=zXxx9Gr9P5oC&pg=PT361
- Gastrow, Peter. Bargaining for peace: South Africa and the National Peace Accord. Washington: US Institute of Peace, 1994. https://books.google.com/books?id=Rhf4_SHwXYcC&pg=PA15
- Marazziti, Mario. 13 Ways of Looking at the Death Penalty. New York: Seven Stories Press., 2015.
- Marshall, Katherine, and Richard Marsh. Millennium challenges for development and faith institutions. World Bank, 14–18, 35. https://books.google.com/books?id=VbRgM923XgYC&pg=PA82
- Morozzo della Rocca, Roberto (Ed.). Making Peace: The Role Played by the Community of Sant'Egidio in the International Arena. New City Press, 2013. ISBN 978-1565485235.
- Riccardi, Andrea, and Peter Heinegg. Sant 'Egidio, Rome and the World. Saint Paul Publications, 1999. ISBN 0-85439-559-8 / ISBN 978-0-85439-559-0.
- Riccardi, Andrea, and the Community of Sant'Egidio, The Sant'Egidio Book of Prayer. Ave Maria Press, 2009. ISBN 1-59471-206-9 / ISBN 978-1-59471-206-7.
