= Water privatization =

Private sector participation in the provision of water services and sanitation

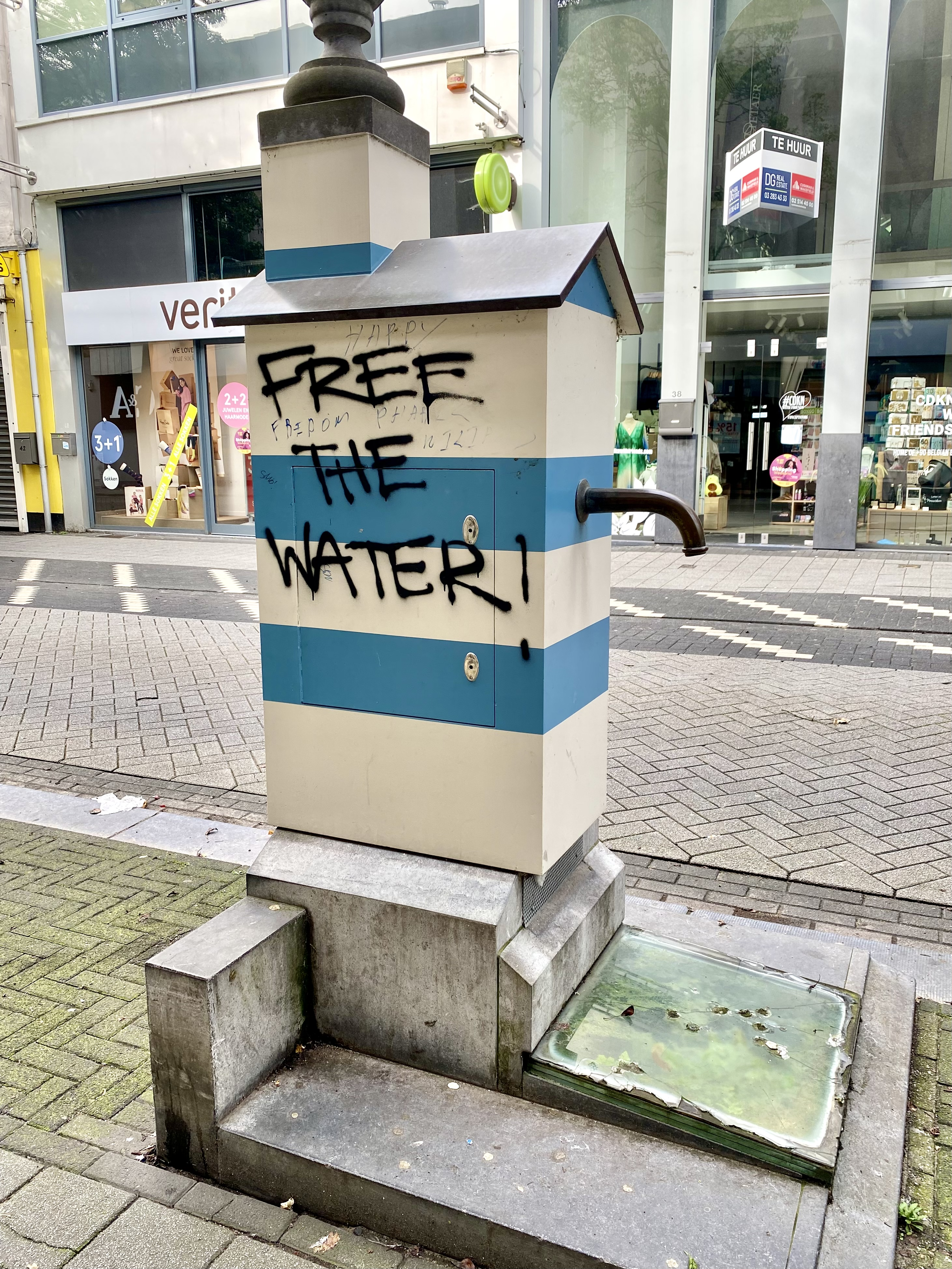
Graffiti against the closure of a public fountain and privatization of water in Turnhout, Flanders.

Water privatization is short for private sector participations in the provision of water services and sanitation. Water privatization has a variable history in which its popularity and favorability has fluctuated in the market and politics. One of the common forms of privatization is public–private partnerships (PPPs). PPPs allow for a mix between public and private ownership and/or management of water and sanitation sources and infrastructure. Proponents of privatization claim that it not only increases efficiency and service quality but can also have significant fiscal benefits. These benefits rarely, if ever materialize and service often becomes more expensive, water quality suffers, or both. There are different forms of regulation in place for current privatization systems.

Private sector participation in water supply and sanitation is controversial. Proponents of private sector participation argue that it has led to improvements in the efficiency and service quality of utilities. It is argued that it has increased investment and has contributed to expanded access. They cite Manila, Guayaquil in Ecuador, Bucharest, several cities in Colombia and Morocco, as well as Côte d'Ivoire and Senegal as success stories. Critics, however, contend that private sector participation led to tariff increases, and privatized water systems are incompatible with ensuring the international human right to water, with the belief that public water will no longer be public. Aborted privatizations in Cochabamba, Bolivia, and Dar es-Salaam, Tanzania, as well as privately managed water systems in Jakarta and Berlin, are highlighted as failures. In 2019, Austria forbade the privatization of water provision via its constitution. Water privatization in Buenos Aires, Argentina and in England are cited by both supporters and opponents, each emphasizing different aspects of these cases.

Figures outlining the accessibility of water from the private sector also display the controversy of private water sources: one source claims that 909 million people were served by "private players" in 2011 globally, up from 681 million people in 2007. This figure includes people served by publicly owned companies that have merely outsourced the financing, construction, and operation of part of their assets, such as water or wastewater treatment plants, to the private sector. The World Bank estimated the urban population directly served by private water operators in developing countries to be much lower at 170 million in 2007. Among them, only about 15 million people, all living in Chile, are served by privately owned utilities. Privately managed but publicly owned companies serve the remainder under concession, lease, and management contracts.

== History ==
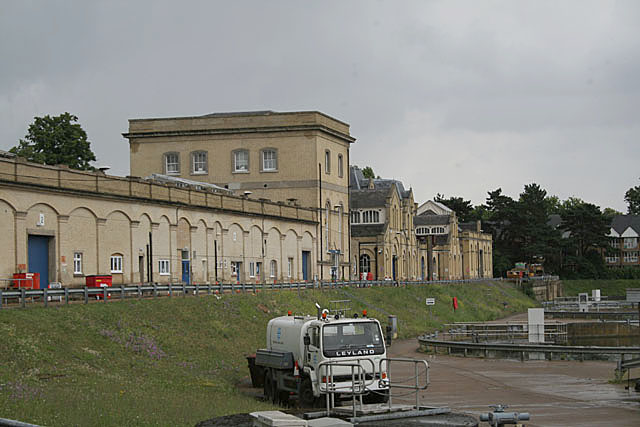
The Hampton water works serving London were part of the assets sold in 1989 as part of the privatization of water supply in England.

Privately owned water utilities were common in Europe, the United States, and Latin America in the mid and late 19th century. Their importance gradually faded away until the early 20th century as they proved unable to expand access and publicly owned utilities became stronger. A second global dawn of private water utilities came in the early 1990s in the aftermath of the Thatcher privatizations in England and Wales, the fall of communism and the ensuing global emphasis on free market policies. The World Bank and the International Monetary Fund played an important role in this process through the conditionality of their lending.

In England and Wales, the emergence of the first private water companies dates back to the 17th century. In 1820, six private water companies operated in London. However, the market share of private water companies in London declined from 40% in 1860 to 10% in 1900. In the 1980s, their share all over England and Wales was about 25%. The tide turned completely in 1989 when the conservative government of Margaret Thatcher privatized all public water and sewer companies in England and Wales. In Scotland local governments dominated by the Labour party kept water systems in public hands.

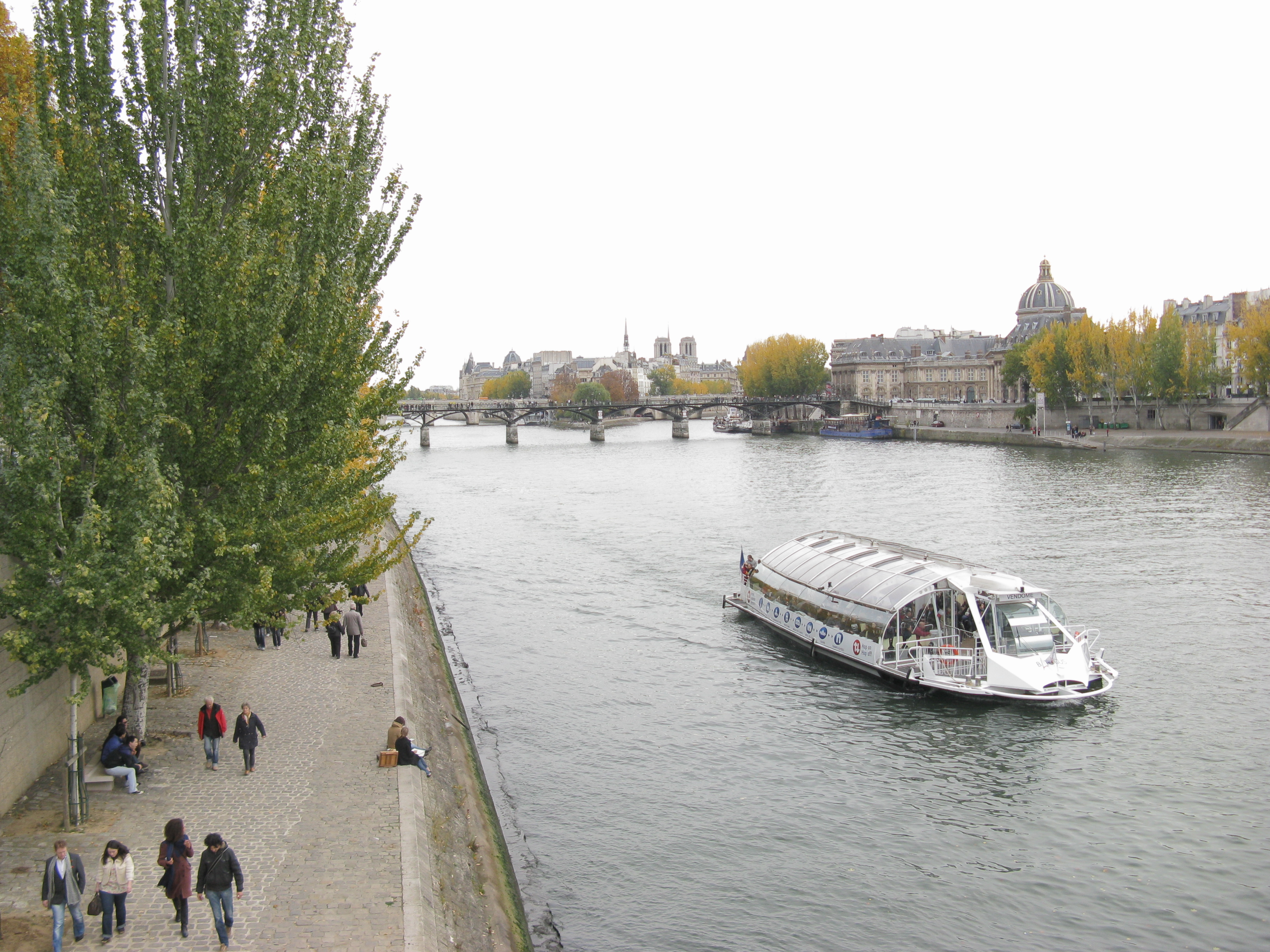
The water supply of Paris was operated by two private companies from 1985 to 2010, each serving one half of the city.

Meanwhile, the water sector in France has always been characterized by a coexistence of public and private management, with their respective shares fluctuating over time. The two largest private companies are Veolia Environnement, formerly the Compagnie Générale des Eaux and then Vivendi Environnement, and Suez Environnement, formerly Lyonnaise des Eaux and then Ondeo. The Compagnie Générale des Eaux was founded in 1853 and Lyonnaise des Eaux in 1880. In the late 19th century, municipal governments, dissatisfied with high tariffs and the lack of expansion of networks to poor neighborhoods, did not renew private concessions and created instead municipally owned utilities. The share of private water operators declined to 17% in 1936. The share of the private sector gradually increased to 32% in 1954, 50% in 1975, and 80% in 2000 using a new model. Instead of the concession contracts, which gave the responsibility to finance investments to the private company, the new lease contracts (affermages) made the private operator only responsible for operation and maintenance, while major investments became a responsibility of the municipalities. The French water companies also escaped the nationalizations after the war and later under President François Mitterrand, because the central government did not want to interfere with the autonomy of municipalities and was unwilling to finance heavy investments. The water supply of Paris was privatized in 1985 when a conservative mayor awarded two lease contracts, each covering one half of the city. In 2010, a socialist mayor remunicipalized the water system of the French capital.

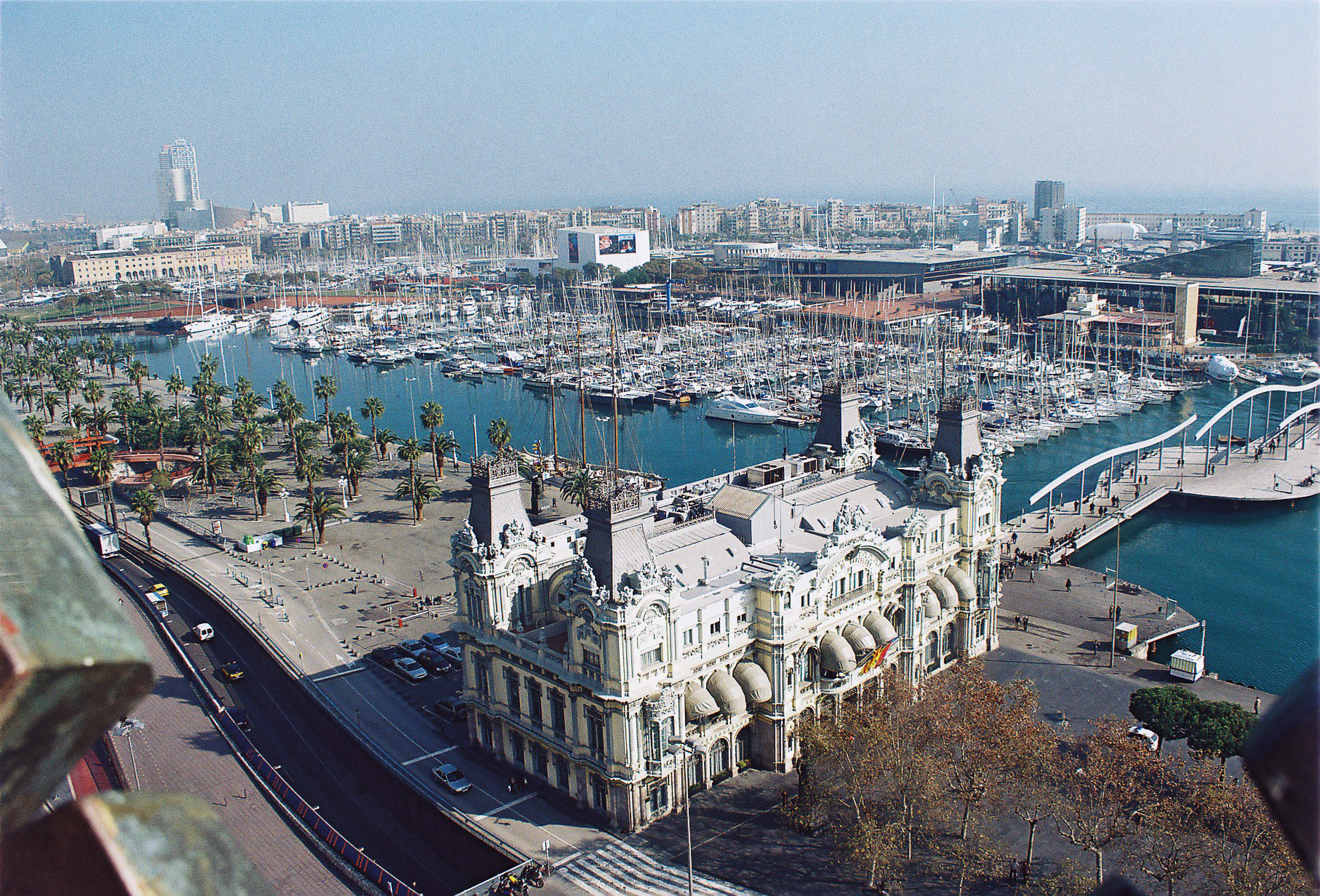
The water supply of Barcelona has been managed by a private company, Aguas de Barcelona, since 1867.

In Spain, private water companies maintained their position, budging the global trend during the late 19th and early 20th century. The largest private water company in Spain is Aguas de Barcelona. Initially created by French and Belgian investors, it was sold to Spanish investors in 1920, only to gradually come back under French control in the early 21st century.

In Germany, a British private water company had set up the first piped water system and treatment plant in Berlin in 1852, but the city, dissatisfied with the lack of investment in particular in sewerage, cancelled the contract in 1873. In 1887 Gelsenwasser was created, which remains an important regional water supplier in the Ruhr district. The German water sector has always been dominated by municipally owned utilities. Despite this, the water system of Berlin was partially privatized in 1999 for fiscal reasons.

In the United States, 60% of piped water systems were privately owned in 1850. However, this share declined to 30% in 1924. As of 2010, 2000 water and wastewater facilities in the U.S. were operated under public-private partnerships, a joint effort between the private group and the municipality it was operating in.

In Chile, the Pinochet dictatorship established 1980 Constitution including the water laws that is a foundation of Chile's water systems. Additionally, the government enacted the 1981 Water Code, a legal regime that decide to eliminate the government involvement in controlling water system and allow citizens to possess rights to exploit water resources. Establishing this Water Code, the Chile's government achieved the water privatization, and this regime is still in force. Today, the government has reduced its power in water resources administration; therefore, 90% of the Chile's drinking water supply is controlled by the transnational corporations. However, this water system causes the imbalance of Chile's distribution of water rights. For example, since Water Code permits companies' to exploit water resources, 71% of Chile's water resources are utilized in irrigation which is equivalent to the annual consumption of 243 millions homes. The inequal distribution of water rights induces the scarcity of Chilean citizens' water resources, particularly in the drought.

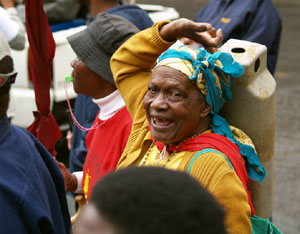
Demonstration in Johannesburg, against the privatization of water, December 2008.

European and local private water companies expanded in Latin America, Africa, and Asia in the second half of the 19th century, all while their importance declined in Europe. In Uruguay, water supply was privately managed from 1867 to 1950; in Buenos Aires, Argentina, for a brief period from 1887 to 1891 and again from 1993 to 2006; in Cairo and Alexandria, Egypt, from 1867 to 1956; in Beirut, Lebanon, from the 19th century until 1951; in Shanghai, China, from 1875 to 1949; in Casablanca, Morocco, from 1914 to 1962 and then again after 1997; in Senegal until 1971 and then again after 1996; and in Côte d'Ivoire from colonial times until today without interruption.

In Central and Eastern Europe, private companies expanded during the late 1990s, especially in Bulgaria, the Czech Republic, Hungary and Romania.

However, some water privatizations failed, most notably in 2000 in Cochabamba, Bolivia, paving the way for a new pragmatism and a reduced emphasis on privatization, and in 2019, Austria forbid the privatization of water provision via its constitution.

== Forms of privatization ==
Broadly speaking, there are two forms of private sector participation in water supply and sanitation. In a full privatization, assets are permanently sold to a private investor. In a public-private partnership, ownership of assets remains public and only certain functions are delegated to a private company for a specific period. Full privatization of water supply and sanitation is an exception today, being limited to England, Chile and some cities in the United States. Public-private partnerships (PPPs) are the most common form of private sector participation in water supply and sanitation today.

The three most common forms of PPPs, in the order of increasing responsibilities for the private partner, are:

- a management contract, under which the private operator is only responsible for running the system, in exchange for a fee that is to some extent performance-related. Investment is financed and carried out by the public sector. The duration is typically 4–7 years.
- a lease contract, under which assets are leased to the private operator who receives a share of revenues. It thus typically bears a higher commercial risk than under a management contract. Investment is fully or mostly financed and carried out by the public sector. The duration is typically 10–15 years.
- a mixed-ownership company in which a private investor takes a minority share in a water company with full management responsibility vested in the private partner.
- a concession, under which the private operator is responsible for running the entire system. Investment is mostly or fully financed and carried out by the private operator. The duration is typically 20–30 years.

Concessions are the most common form of PPPs in water supply and sanitation. They are followed by leases, also called affermages, most commonly used in France and Francophone West Africa. Management contracts are used in Saudi Arabia, Algeria and Armenia, among others. Mixed-ownership companies are most common in Spain, Colombia, and Mexico.

A concession for the construction of a new plant is called a Build-Operate-Transfer (BOT) contract. Under a BOT contract the private operator signs an agreement with a utility that purchases treated water or wastewater treatment services.

== Motives ==
The government of Cuba entrusted the water supply of Havana to a private company in order to improve service quality, showing the diversity of motives behind water privatization.

The motives for water privatization vary from one case to another, and they often determine which mode of privatization is chosen: management and lease contracts are used to increase efficiency and improve service quality while asset sales and concessions primarily aim to reduce the financial burden or to expand access. Ideological motives and external influences also play a role, with market-liberal ideology favoring privatization, left-leaning ideologies opposing, and both conservatives and centrists falling in between, often based on local and business-minded considerations. Usually, several of the above motives are combined.

=== Increasing efficiency and improving service quality ===
Water privatization is seen by some of its proponents, particularly those of a neoliberal socio-economic perspective, as a solution to improving poorly managed public water utility systems. Symptoms of poor management can include low water bill collection, high water losses (known as non-revenue water), and intermittent water supply, sometimes lasting only for a few hours a day or a few days per week. In Algeria, Saudi Arabia, Colombia and Cuba increasing efficiency and improving service quality were principal motives for water privatization. In these cases, the argument to privatize water is predicated on the belief that by adopting a market-based approach to the management of water, the service provider will be incentivized by profit to increase efficiency and improve service quality. Some critics argue that this belief is misguided because the water utility sector is typically monopolized by one private company. They claim that this counteracts many of the advantages associated with the market economy because without competition between multiple water service businesses there is nothing to drive prices down and levels of efficiency up.

=== External influences ===
External influences, such as from the World Bank and the International Monetary Fund (IMF), often play a role in the decision of governments to privatize water, as was the case in Bolivia and in several African countries. This influence may take the form of structural adjustment programs, whereby a development loan is given on the condition that the receiving country privatize their water utility system. Other aid agencies have also supported water privatization. These include the Inter-American Development Bank (e.g., in Ecuador, Colombia and Honduras), the Asian Development Bank (e.g., in China), the European Bank for Reconstruction and Development in Eastern Europe, German development cooperation through KfW (e.g., in Albania, Armenia, Jordan and Peru), French development cooperation (e.g., in Senegal) and British development cooperation (e.g., in Tanzania and Guyana). Critics claim that these external influences are problematic and argue that influencing water privatization is part of a broader movement of Western powers imposing neoliberalism on countries in the Global South. In the UK, the World Development Movement campaigned against the support of water privatization through aid from the UK.

=== Financial motives ===
In some cases, where access is already universal and service quality is good, financial motives dominate, as it was the case in Berlin, Germany, and in Chile. In Berlin the state government sold a 49.9% share of its water utility in 1999 for 1.69bn Euros in exchange for a guaranteed profit for the private shareholders amounting to the interest rate on 10-year government bonds plus 2 percent, as specified in a contract that was kept confidential until the state government was forced by a referendum to make it public. As a result, tariffs increased (15% in 2004 alone) and the state government's revenues from the company declined compared to the situation before privatization (168m Euro profit for the state in 1997 compared to a 10m Euro loss in 2003). In Chile, where no wastewater treatment plants existed prior to privatization, the government's desire to finance their construction off-budget drove privatization in 1998.

Financial motives for water privatization are also common in countries where water access and service quality is poor. In cities with rapidly growing slums, it is very expensive for the government to expand their water utility system infrastructure at the pace of the growing population. Furthermore, maintaining the good condition of old infrastructure is also expensive. Thus, if a significant portion of public funds is not allocated to maintenance, pipes and waste water treatment plants can fall into disrepair. For some countries, the cost of managing a public water utility system becomes unaffordable. In these cases, privatization can be seen as a possible solution for governments to attract national and international private investment.

== Prevalence ==
=== Prevalence of public-private partnerships ===
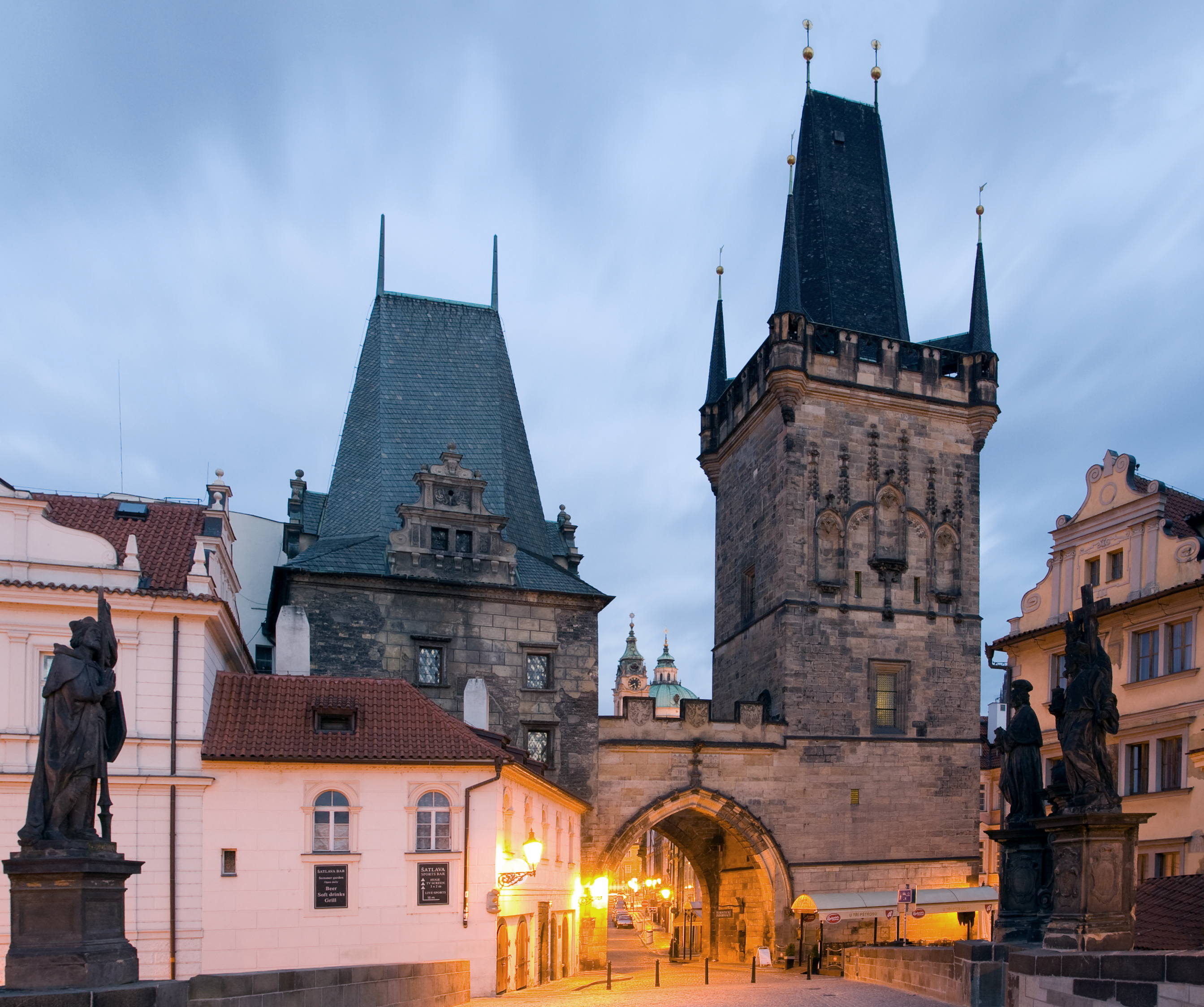
Prague is one of many cities whose water supply is provided by a private company.

There are widely differing estimates of the number of people served by private water companies. The World Bank estimated that, as of 2007, about 270 million people received water from private companies in more than 40 countries, including about 160 million in developed countries and 110 million in developing countries. However, the report did not include estimates of the number of people served by private companies on the wastewater side.

The Pinsent Masons Water Yearbook uses a broader definition including also wastewater services. More importantly, it also includes cases where a water or wastewater treatment plant is operated by a private company on behalf of a publicly owned and operated utility that serves the final customer. On the basis of this broader definition and taking into account the growth of both population and water privatization between 2007 and 2011, it estimates that 909 million in 62 countries or 13% of the world population were served by the private sector in one form or another. This includes 309 million people in China, 61 million in the United States, 60 million in Brazil, 46 million in France, 23 million in Spain, 15 million in India and 14 million in Russia. In England and Wales the entire population of 55 million is served by private companies. In addition, in Chile, the Czech Republic, Armenia, and three African countries – Côte d'Ivoire, Gabon and Senegal – private companies provide water services to the entire urban population. In Hungary, they serve almost half the population. In Algeria, Colombia, Germany, Italy, Malaysia, Mexico, Morocco, Poland, and South Africa less than half the population is served by private companies. In the Philippines, Indonesia, Bulgaria, Estonia, and Cuba, private water companies serve only the capital city.

24 countries, such as Argentina, Bolivia, Ghana and the Central African Republic, had reverted to public management as of 2009. However, 84 percent of contracts awarded mostly in the 1990s were still active.

On the other hand, in many countries, such as in Japan, Canada, Egypt, Pakistan, or Scandinavia, there are no private water companies. Nicaragua, the Netherlands, and Uruguay have even passed laws banning water privatization. In Italy, in June 2011 a law favoring water privatization was repealed by an overwhelming majority of Italians through a referendum. In 2019, the City of Baltimore, Maryland became the first major city in the United States to ban water privatization.

List of countries with formal private sector participation in urban water supply with number and type of contracts
Country	Extent of country served by privatized urban water supply	Type and number of contracts	Start date
France	9,000	Concessions and leases	1853
United Kingdom	England	Full privatization (26)	1989
United States	73 million people, including through PPPs; 14% of water revenues without PPPs	Investor-owned and 2,000 PPPs	1772 in Providence
Côte d'Ivoire	All urban areas	Lease (1)	1960 in Abidjan; 1973 country-wide
Gabon	All urban areas	Concession (1)	1997
Mozambique	Maputo and other cities	Lease (1) and management contract (1)	1999
Senegal	All urban areas	Lease (1)	1996
South Africa	Mbombela and Dolphin Coast	Concessions (2)	1992
Malaysia	Selangor and Penang	Concession (1) and full privatization (1)	1992
Indonesia	Jakarta	Concessions (2)	1998
Philippines	Manila	Concessions (2)	1997
Armenia	Yerevan and others	Lease (1) and management contracts (2)	2000
Brazil	65 cities in 10 states	Concessions	1995
Chile	All urban areas	Full privatizations and concession (1)	1998
Colombia	Barranquilla, Cartagena, Colombia and more than 40 other cities and towns	Mixed-ownership companies and concessions	1996
Ecuador	Guayaquil	Concession (1)	2001
Morocco	Casablanca, Rabat, Tangiers and Tetouan	Concessions (3)	1997
Honduras	San Pedro Sula	Concession (1)	2000
Ghana	All urban areas until 2011	Management contract (1)	2000
Saudi Arabia	Riyadh, Jeddah, Mecca and Taif	Management contracts (3)	2008
Algeria	Algiers, Constantine and Oran	Management contracts (3)	2005
Cuba	Havana	Concession (1)	2000
China	Shenzhen, Fuzhou, Lanzhou, Wuhu City and 23 others	Concessions (22), full privatizations (3) and management contracts (2)	2001
Spain	Barcelona and more than 1,000 other municipalities	Mixed-ownership companies and concessions	1867
Romania	Bucharest, Timișoara, Ploiești and Otopeni	Concessions (3) and Lease (1)	2000
Bulgaria	Sofia	Concession (1)	2000
Poland	Gdańsk, Bielsko-Biała, Tarnowskie Góry & Miasteczko Śląskie, Dąbrowa Górnicza, Głogów, Woźniki, Drobin and Toszek	Full privatizations (4), concession (1), leases (2) and management contract (1)	1992
Estonia	Tallinn	Concession (1)	2001
Czech Republic	Prague and 23 other cities	Concessions (24)	1993 (reform); 2001 (Prague)
Hungary	Budapest, Szeged, Debrecen and five other cities and towns	Concessions (8)	1994
Mexico	Cancún, Saltillo and Aguascalientes	Mixed-ownership company (1) and concessions (2)	1993

A World Bank report lists the following examples of successful public-private partnerships in developing countries: the full privatization in Chile; the mixed companies in Colombia; the concessions in Guayaquil in Ecuador, Brazil, Argentina, Eastern Manila in the Philippines, Morocco, and Gabun; and the lease contracts in Côte d'Ivoire, Senegal, and Yerevan in Armenia.

=== Small-scale operators: the other private sector ===
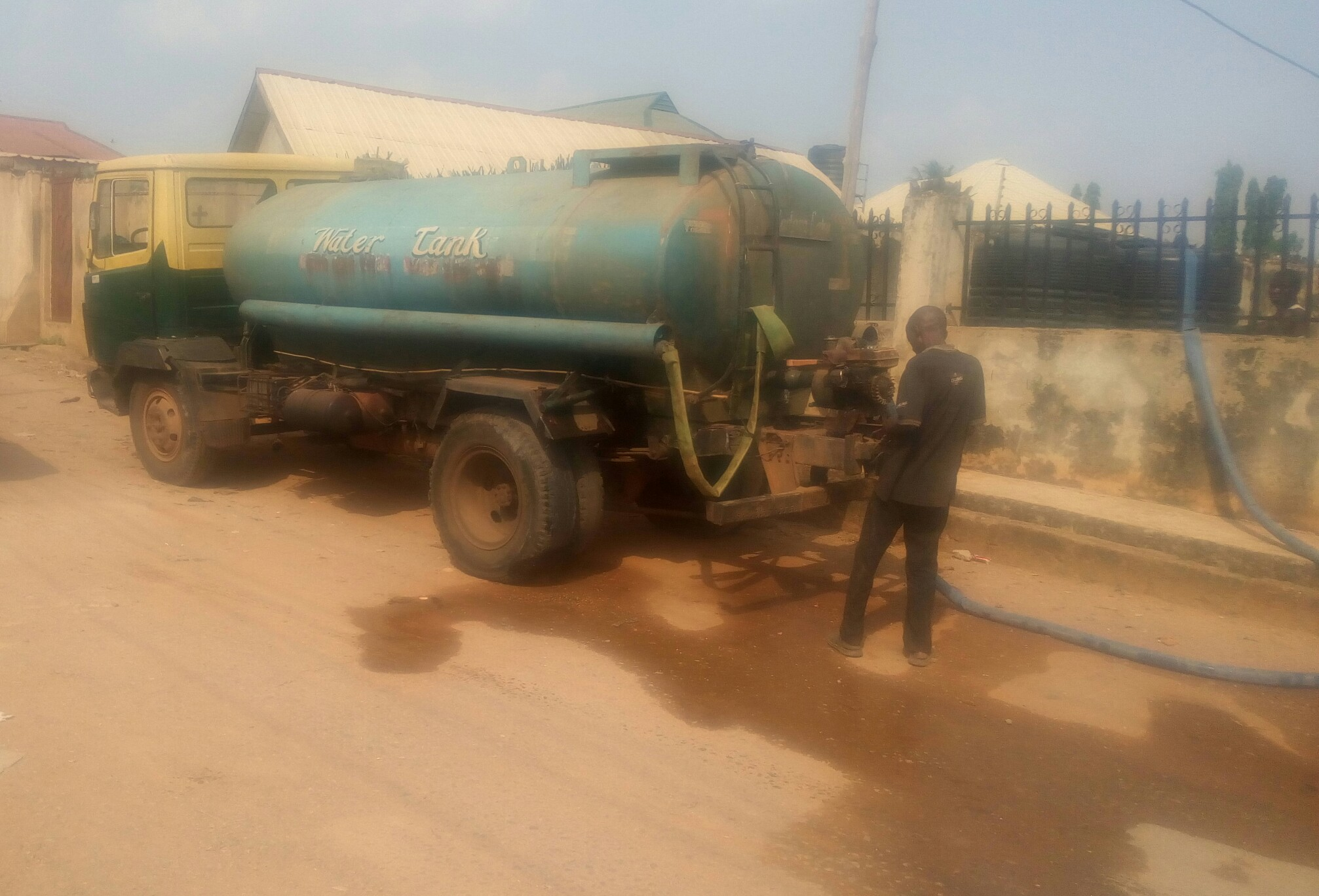
A small scale private operator using a water tanker to distribute water.

Beyond water privatization, which involves contractual relationships between a government and formally established large companies, there is also "the other private sector" in water supply consisting of small-scale, often informal local operators. They exist in most cities in the Global South and sometimes provide a large portion of the city's population with water. For example, a study of six Latin American countries showed that they provide water to 25% of the population in seven cities. In Africa, they serve an estimated 50% of the urban population. They mainly operate in slums, serving the people who are not catered to by the city authorities. Many small-scale water operators provide water through tanker trucks or animal-drawn carts. Others operate water distribution networks fed by wells, as it is the case in Asunción, Paraguay, and in Sanaa, Yemen.

Small-scale operators can be owned by individual entrepreneurs or can take the form of cooperatives, as it is the case in Honduras. Small-scale operators do not always comply with technical norms and the quality of the water they provide or their tariffs are often not regulated. More often than not, their tariffs are significantly higher than those of public water utilities. This can attributed to either profiteering or simply the high transportation costs expended during the distribution of water. They typically lack capital to further expand their network. However, in a few pilot cases – such as in Kenya, Uganda, Cambodia and Vietnam – international aid agencies have provided them with grants to increase access, often in the form of output-based aid.

== Selecting private operators ==
Private companies are typically selected through international competitive bidding and need to have demonstrated previous experience. Selection is either done through a combination of price and quality, or solely based on price. In the case of a management contract, the price is the management fee (fixed fee plus performance-based fee); in the case of a lease it is the lease fee per unit of water sold; in a concession it is the water tariff; and in an asset sale it is the price paid for the company. In some cases – such as in Casablanca in 1997 and in Jakarta in 1998 – private companies have been selected through direct negotiations without competitive bidding. In other cases – such as in Cartagena (Colombia) in 1995, Cochabamba (Bolivia) in 1999 and Guayaquil (Ecuador) in 2000 – only a single bid was submitted. If development aid agencies are involved in directly financing private sector participation, they systematically require competitive bidding. However, in some cases – such as in Timişoara, Romania – the European Bank for Reconstruction and Development has financed parallel investments, while a concession was awarded by the government after direct negotiations.

== Forms of regulation ==
Being monopolies, all water utilities – public or private – need to be regulated concerning tariff approvals, service quality, environmental compliance and other aspects. The awareness for the need to regulate typically increases substantially when profit-oriented private operators become involved: Monitoring the performance of both the private and the public partner, applying sanctions in case of non-compliance and dispute resolution become particularly important. The regulatory tasks depend on the form of private sector participation: Under a management contract the monitoring of the achievement of performance standards, on which the remuneration of the private company depends, is typically carried out by an independent consulting firm. Under a concession contract or in the case of an asset sale, tariff regulation through a regulatory agency or the government is a key regulatory function. Water concessions are frequently renegotiated, often resulting in better terms for the private company. For example, negotiations of concessions in Buenos Aires and Manila resulted in investment requirements being reduced, tariffs being increased and tariffs being indexed to the exchange rate to the US dollar. The quality and strength of regulation is an important factor that influences whether water privatization fails or succeeds. The tasks, form and capacity of the public entities charged with regulation vary greatly between countries.

Globally, regulation of private water companies is being carried out by the following types of public entities or, sometimes, a combination of them.

Type of entity charged with the regulation of private water providers	Examples
Municipality or an association of smaller municipalities	France and Spain
Specialized body at the city level set up to regulate a single contract	Guayaquil, Ecuador; San Pedro Sula, Honduras; Jakarta, Indonesia (with some control by the national government in the latter case); Manila, Philippines; formerly in Buenos Aires, Argentina
Specialized regulatory agency at the supra-municipal sub-national level	Public Utilities Commissions in U.S. states; some Brazilian states
Specialized regulatory agency set up permanently under law at the country level	OFWAT in England; Water Superintendency SISS in Chile; Water Regulatory Commission CRA in Colombia
Specialized unit in a Ministry set up temporarily by decree	Ministry of Water in Jordan
Ministerial department	Ministry of Interior in Morocco

== Examples of privatization ==
The best-known examples of water privatization in the late 20th century are those undertaken in England under Margaret Thatcher, the Manila and Buenos Aires concessions as well as the failed privatization in Cochabamba, Bolivia, which became a symbol of the struggle against globalization. Less well known, but just as relevant, are water privatizations in other countries, such as in Colombia.

=== France ===
Private water firms have had a dominant role in France for more than a century. Private water firms (Veolia Water, Suez Environnement and smaller peers such as Saur) control 60 percent of France's water market. Veolia and Suez are the world's largest private international water and wastewater firms.

Water privatization in France has been going on from before the 1800s but only recently, around the 1960s, has it grown in size and power. In the 20 years between the 1950s and 1970s it is estimated that the private water sector increased its share of potable water supply by at least 20%, a figure that has increased to around 75% in the current present. The water supply is now owned by three major companies. In the 3600 local municipalities in France each of them has the power to decide whether or not they publicize or privatize drinking water and dictate the terms of the contract.

The funding of French Water Agencies is completely done in by themselves. Meaning that these companies are self-funded. The total revenue is hard to estimate but from 1992 to 1996 around 81 Billion French Francs were held in revenue by these Water Agencies. This large fund is mostly used to expand and maintain public and private water projects. This model, although very profitable, lacks economic regulation due to poor logistics. This is a problem which is in the process of being fixed by implementing a clear and well-defined contract between the Water Agencies and the contractors who build the infrastructure.

=== England and Wales ===
In England and Wales, water tariffs, water company debt, water company dividends and profits increased substantially after privatization in 1989, but investments also increased and water quality in rivers improved. Tariffs increased by 46% in inflation-adjusted terms during the first nine years after privatization. Operating profits have more than doubled (+142%) in the first eight years. From privatisation in 1989 to December 2023, water company debt has increased by £60.3bn, during which time £53bn has been paid out in dividends. On the other hand, privatization increased investments: In the six years after privatization the companies invested £17 billion, compared to £9.3 billion in the six years before privatization. It also brought about compliance with stringent drinking water standards and led to a higher quality of river water. According to data from OFWAT, the economic regulator of water and sewer companies in England and Wales, from the early 1990s until 2010, network pressure has improved substantially, supply interruptions have become less frequent, the responsiveness to complaints has improved and leakage has been reduced.

In the 1980s, the elite largely believed that the state was not building infrastructure for water in a manner that would allow the economy to grow appropriately. For this reason, the economic and political powerful spearhead a shift towards making water a privately owned utility. Recently, the entire privatized water systems have been undergoing a complete restructuring. Small water companies in the UK have also been purchased by multinational companies from the United States, France and Scotland. The privately owned companies have been found to have trouble with water quality, environment pollution, sewage management, leakage and logistical errors.

=== Manila, the Philippines ===
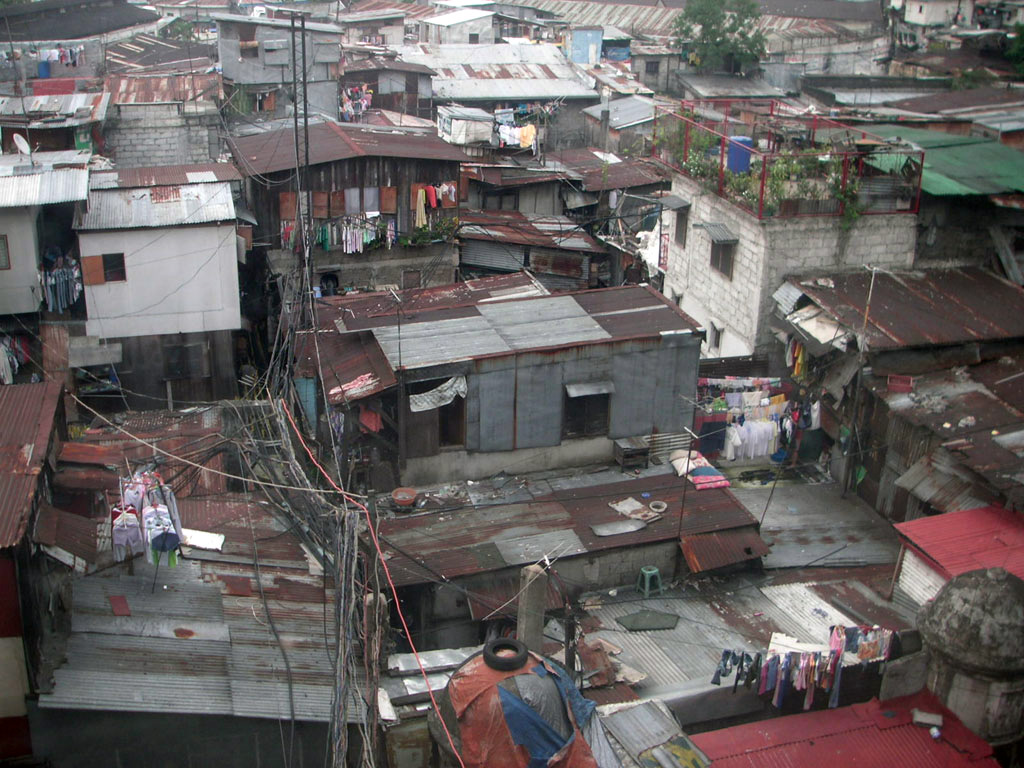
The private companies providing water in Manila have expanded access of water supply to the poor living in slums.

Water privatization in Manila began in 1997 with the award of two concession contracts for the Eastern and Western halves of Metro Manila. The concessions represent the largest population served by private operators in the developing world. As of 2010, the concession in Eastern Manila is highly successful and has led to significant improvements in access, service quality and efficiency: the population served more than doubled from 3 in 1997 to 6.1 million in 2009, the share of customers with continuous water supply increased from 26% to more than 98% and non-revenue water declined from 63% to 16%.

The concession in Western Manila failed when the company Maynilad went bankrupt in 2003. It was sold to new investors in 2007 and performance has improved since then. The share of the population with access to piped water in Western Manila increased from 67% in 1997 to 86% in 2006 and the share of customers that enjoys 24-hour water supply increased from 32% in 2007 to 71% in early 2011.

=== Argentina ===
Water privatization in Argentina began in 1992 under the government of Carlos Menem as part of one of the world's largest privatization programs. Concessions were signed in 28% of the country's municipalities covering 60% of the population, including in 1993 for the metropolitan area of Buenos Aires. After the 2001 economic crisis, under the government of Néstor Kirchner, almost all concessions were terminated, including in Buenos Aires in 2006. The impact of the concession remains controversial. The government and critics argue that the concessionaire failed to achieve the targets set under the concession contract in terms of expansion of access, investment and service quality. Proponents concede that targets were not reached, but argue that a freeze in tariffs at the time of the devaluation of the Peso during the Argentinian economic crisis in 2001 violated the contract and thus made it impossible to achieve the original targets. According to the Argentinian economist Sebastian Galiani, the public company OSN had invested only US$25m per year between 1983 and 1993, while the private concessionaire Aguas Argentinas increased investments to around US$200m per year between 1993 and 2000.

According to the private concessionnaire Suez, during the 13-year-duration of its concession it extended access to water to 2 million people and access to sanitation to 1 million people, despite the economic crisis. In July 2010 the International Center for the Settlement of Investment Disputes (ICSID) ruled that the Argentinian government unfairly refused to allow the private concessionaires to raise tariffs during the period after the devaluation of the Argentine peso in 2001 and that the private companies are entitled to damages. The private companies announced that they would seek US$1.2bn in damages.

=== Cochabamba, Bolivia ===
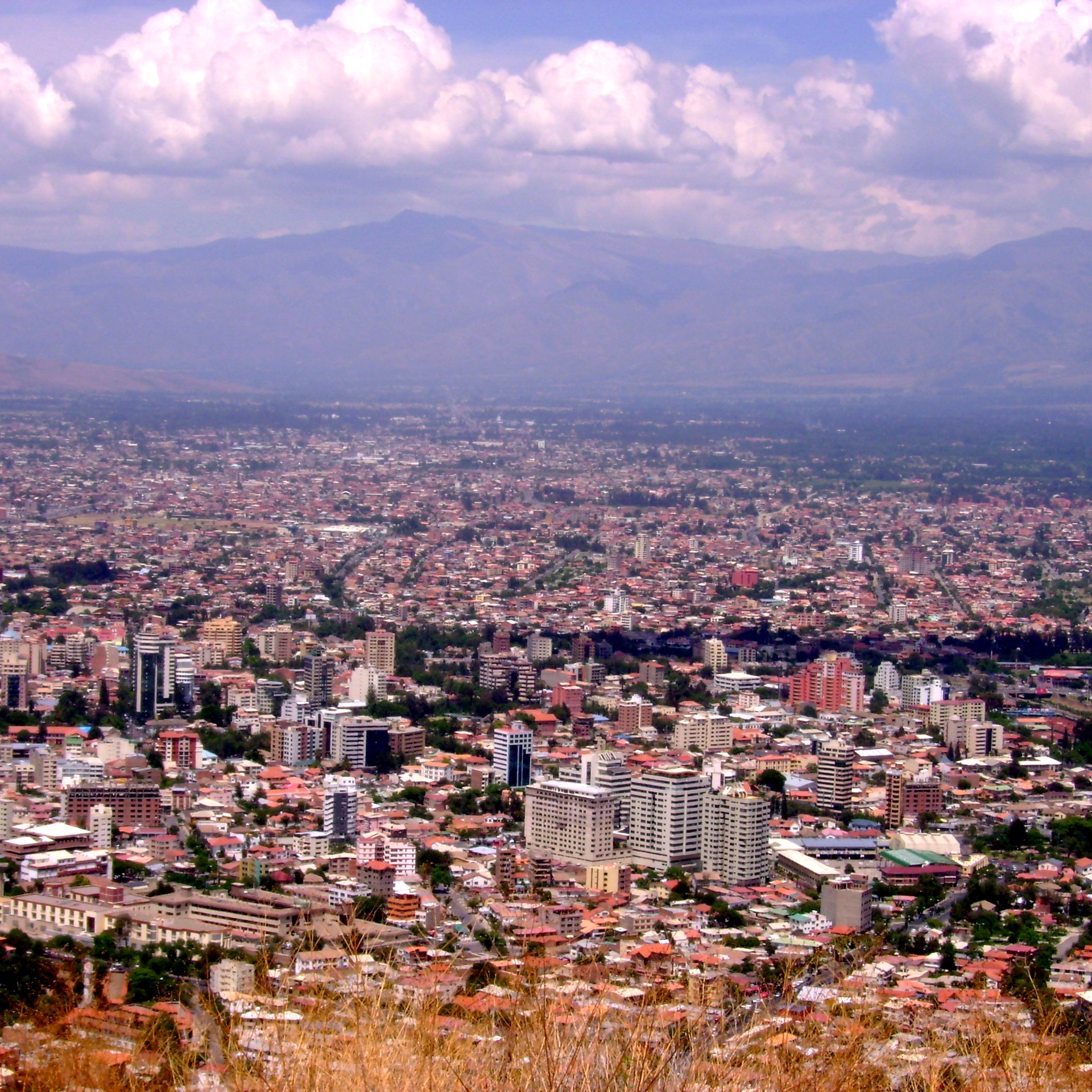
Cochabamba was the scene of violent protests against water privatization in 2000.

In the mid-1990s the government of Bolivia, under pressure from the World Bank, decided to privatize water supply in the country's third largest city, Cochabamba. In the previous years, despite encumbered funds made available by the World Bank to support the public utility of Cochabamba, access to piped water in the city had decreased to 40%. Water losses had remained high at 40%, and water was supplied only 4 hours a day. Those not connected to the network paid ten times as much for their water to private vendors as those who were. This contrasted with the situation in Bolivia's second-largest city, Santa Cruz, where a utility run as a cooperative had managed to increase access and improve service quality with the support of the World Bank. In Santa Cruz, privatization had never been considered.

In 1997, a first bid for a water concession in Cochabamba had been declared void at the request of the mayor of Cochabamba, Manfred Reyes Villa. He wanted the construction of a large dam, the Misicuni dam, and a pipeline from the dam to the city to be included in the concession. The World Bank had opposed the dam as unnecessarily expensive and subsequently ended its involvement related to water supply in the city. Despite this, in the view of the public the World Bank remains inseparably linked to the Cochabamba privatization.

The government proceeded to bid out the concession; this time including the Misicuni dam. Only a single company submitted a bid, Aguas del Tunari, a consortium led by Bechtel. The government accepted the bid and signed the concession. The consortium was guaranteed a minimum 15% annual return. In parallel, a law was passed that appeared to give a monopoly to Aguas del Tunari over all water resources, including water used for irrigation, communal water systems and even rainwater collected on roofs. Upon taking control the company raised water tariffs by 35%.

Demonstrations and a general strike erupted in January 2000 in protest against the tariff increase and the perceived privatization of water resources. The government arrested the leader of the protesters, Oscar Olivera. However, the protests spread to the entire country and the government declared a state of emergency in April. Protests still continued and several people were killed. In the midst of the turmoil the employees of Aguas del Tunari fled from Cochabamba. The government finally released Oscar Olivera and signed an agreement with him stating that the concession would be ended. The government then told Aguas del Tunari that by leaving Cochabamba they had abandoned the concession and parliament revoked Law 2029. The Cochabamba protests became a worldwide symbol of struggle against neoliberalism and the Cochabamba privatization is probably, both among activists against globalization and the general public, by far the best known example of the failure of water privatization.

The company, insisting that it had been forced out, filed a $25 million lawsuit in the International Centre for Settlement of Investment Disputes. The proceedings, which were held behind closed doors, ended in 2006 with a settlement under which Bechtel dropped its claim. With financing from the Inter-American Development Bank the city expanded its piped water system in the aftermath of the riots. Nevertheless, under public management half of the 600,000 people of Cochabamba remain without piped water and those with it continue to receive intermittent service. Oscar Olivera the leading figure in the protests admitted, "I would have to say we were not ready to build new alternatives."

=== Colombia ===
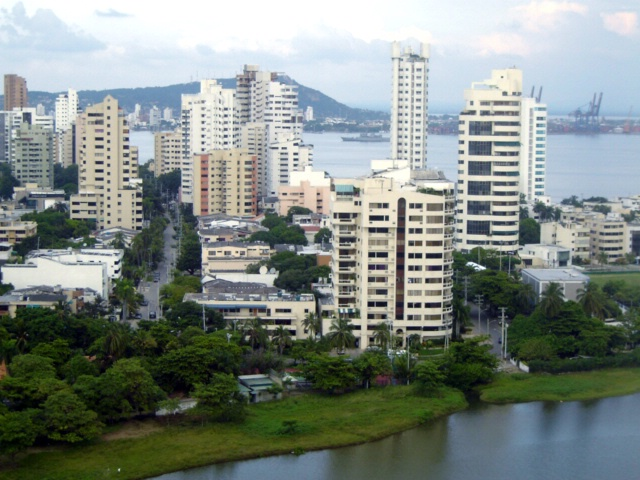
Cartagena is one of the Colombian cities whose water supply is provided by a mixed public-private company.

Between 1996 and 2007, public-private partnerships for water and sewer services in more than 40 Colombian cities were entered into, serving more than 20% of the country's urban population. Most of the contracts were awarded in municipalities with highly deteriorated infrastructure, such as Barranquilla and Cartagena. The central government financed most investments through grants, thus reducing the need to increase tariffs. Water privatization in Colombia was largely homegrown, adapting models used elsewhere to the particular circumstances and culture of Colombia. A model introduced from Spain, the mixed company with a majority stake by the municipality and a minority stake by a private operator, was particularly successful. Foreign water companies won some of the early contracts, but quickly sold a majority of their shares to Colombian operators. There was a significant increase in access under private contracts.

For example, in Cartagena, water supply coverage increased from 74 percent to almost universal coverage, while sewer coverage went up from 62 percent to 79 percent between 1996 and 2006. Half a million people gained access and 60 percent of the new connections benefited families in the poorest income quintile. To achieve universal coverage, the operator made extensive use of community bulk-supply schemes that provide safe water to the many illegal settlements that were expanding on the city's periphery. However, there is no conclusive evidence showing that access increased more rapidly under private contracts than in the case of publicly managed utilities. In Cartagena, tariffs declined substantially, indicating that the operator passed on efficiency gains to consumers.

== Impact of privatization ==
The evidence concerning the impact of water privatization is mixed. Often proponents and opponents of water privatization emphasize those examples, studies, methods and indicators that support their respective point of view. As with any empirical study, results are influenced by the methods used. For example, some studies simply compare the situation before privatization to the situation after privatization. More sophisticated studies try to compare the changes in privately managed utilities to those of publicly managed utilities that operate under similar conditions during the same period. The second group of studies often use econometric techniques. The results also depend on the choice of the indicator used to measure impact: One common indicator is the increase in access to water supply and sewerage. Other indicators are changes in tariffs, investments, water-borne diseases or indicators for service quality (e.g. continuity of supply or drinking water quality) and efficiency (e.g. water losses or labor productivity).

=== Impact on access ===
A before after comparative study by World Bank analyzes how access, quality of service, operational efficiency and tariffs have evolved under 65 public-private partnerships for urban water utilities in developing countries. The study estimates that "PPP projects have provided access to piped water for more than 24 million people in developing countries since 1990".

Privatized water companies generally increase tariffs to earn more profits, which consequently reduces the accessibility of the resource for poor households since the poor are not able to pay high tariffs. In other words, investments are only made to improve accessibility in richer districts where the people can pay the tariffs. In this manner, the water company's need to make adequate returns is met by supplying water only to those who can pay. However, in other countries such as Nigeria and Ghana where the governments fail to distribute access to water to the people, water privatization led to expansion of services to low-income districts.

=== Impact on health ===
One of the most effective measures of the effectiveness of water privatization is child mortality rate, since children are more likely to be adversely affected by contaminated water. Water privatization has historically had mixed impacts on child mortality and the overall health of the people affected by it. A study found that, between 1991 and 1997 in Argentina, areas where child mortality was upwards of 26% fell to just under 8% after water was privatized, because the regulations imposed on private water companies were more rigorous than their government-controlled counterparts. Along with this, development of water infrastructure in impoverished areas at the hands of private companies also reduced child mortality rates. Some governments privatize water companies, among other reasons, to improve the quality of the water supply.

However in Argentina, water privatization did not fulfill many promises the citizens were expecting. This included the expansion of sewerage treatment and connections and the reduction in the price of water, which actually increased. Along with this, the private water companies in Argentina needed help from the national government to bypass regulatory agencies after it treated to cancel their contract due to conflicts of interest. Many workers' unions were opposed to privatizing water, but their pleas were largely ignored by the Argentine government.

The impact of water privatization on the amount of carcinogenic substances found in the water supply is highly debated. In some cases, such as the German state of North Rhine-Westphalia, public water systems are likely to invest more money into improving water quality. Water companies working on a commercial basis might find it too costly to implement systems to better the water quality beyond what is necessary by law. This might increase the risk of harmful cancer-causing substances in the water.

=== Impact on tariffs ===
Although the impact on tariffs cannot be fully concluded since each country has different policy on tariffs, water tariffs tend to be increased under privatization. For instance, in Buenos Aires and in Manila, tariffs first declined, but then increased above their initial level; in Cochabamba or in Guyana, tariffs were increased at the time of privatization. However, there are some other cases that tariffs under water privatization did not increase in a long run, typically in Sub-Saharan Africa, where most of investments are funded through development aid. For example, tariffs remained stable in Senegal, while in Gabon they declined by 50% in five years (2001–2006) and by 30% in ten years in Côte d'Ivoire (1990 to 2000).

In addition, initial tariffs have been well below cost recovery levels in almost all cases, sometimes covering only a fraction of the cost of service provision. The magnitude of tariff increases is influenced by the profit margin of private operators, but also to a large extent by the efficiency of utilities in terms of water losses and labor productivity.

However, comparing water expenditure between private and public management in the U.S., a study of household water expenditures in cities under private and public management in the U.S. concludes that "whether water systems are owned by private firms or governments may, on average, simply not matter much."

=== Impact on efficiency ===
According to a World Bank study in 2005, the most consistent improvement made by public-private partnerships in water supply was in operational efficiency. The study reviews the impact of private management on the efficiency of water utilities in many countries from many continents including Africa, Latin America, Asia, and Eastern Europe. Most evidences from the study suggests that "there is no statistically significant difference between the efficiency performance of public and private operators in this sector.". In addition, a 2008 literature review by the Asian Development Bank shows that of 20 studies reviewed, only three show concrete evidence on technical efficiency improvements or cost reductions under private management. Therefore, by 2005, private operator, at least, made an indirect contribution to financing by improving efficiency, making it possible for utilities to finance investments internally instead of having to rely on more debt.

=== Profitability ===
An empirical study of 34 concessions in nine Latin American countries during the 1990s, including 10 water concessions in 5 countries (3 in Argentina, 1 in Bolivia, 1 in Brazil, 3 in Chile and 2 in Colombia), has estimated the profitability of concessions compared to the cost of capital of private companies. According to the study, contrary to public perception, the financial returns of private infrastructure concessions have been modest. The average annual return on capital employed was 7 percent. For a number of concessions, the returns have been below the cost of capital. On average telecommunications and energy concessions have fared much better than water concessions. Seven out of 10 water concessions had negative rates of return and two concessions had returns that were lower than the cost of capital of the private companies.

== Private water operators ==
Private water operators come in very different forms from multinational corporations to small enterprises. According to the Pinsent Masons Water Yearbook 2010–11, 909 million people (13% of the world population) were served by private operators. The largest private water companies are:

- the French firm Veolia Environnement (Vivendi), serving 125.4 million in 2011;
- the French firm Suez, serving 124.3 million people in 2011 with its US subsidiary United Water and its Spanish subsidiary Aguas de Barcelona;
- the Spanish firm Fomento de Construcciones Y Contratas SA (FCC), serving 28.2 million people in 2011;
- the German firm RWE, serving 18.3 million people in 2011;
- the Italian firm ACEA, serving 18 million people in 2011;
- the British firm Thames Water, indirectly owned by Macquarie Group, an Australian investment bank;
- the French firm SAUR, serving 12.4 million in 2011; and
- the US firm American Water, serving 16.8 million in 2011.

Domestic water operators have a strong presence in Brazil, Colombia, China, Malaysia, and the Philippines.

Public water companies also sometimes participate in bids for private water contracts. For example, the Moroccan state-owned water utility ONEP has won a bid in Cameroon and the Dutch publicly owned water firm Vitens has won a management contract in Ghana.

== See also ==
- Water consumption
- Remunicipalization
- Bottled water
- Nestlé Waters

Countries and cities with private sector participation in water supply as of 2013:

- Water privatization in Algeria
- Water privatization in Armenia
- Water privatization in Brazil
- Water privatization in Bucharest
- Water privatization in Chile
- Water privatization in Colombia
- Water privatization in Cuba
- Water privatization in Ecuador
- Water privatisation in England
- Water privatization in Honduras
- Water privatization in Jakarta
- Water privatization in Metro Manila
- Water privatization in Morocco
- Water privatization in South Africa
- Water privatization in the United States

Countries which had private sector participation in water supply in the past:

- Water privatization in Albania
- Water privatization in Argentina
- Water privatization in Bolivia
- Water privatization in Ghana
- Water privatization in Guinea
- Water privatization in Tanzania
