= Water privatization in Colombia =

Private sector participation (also called "water privatization" or "public-private partnerships", PPP) in water supply and sanitation in Colombia has been more stable and successful than in some other Latin American countries such as Argentina or Bolivia. According to the World Bank, between 1996 and 2007, more than 40 water and sanitation service provision contracts have been awarded to private or mixed companies in Colombia, serving a combined population of 7.3 million or more than 20% of the urban population. According to the Colombian water regulator, there were even more public-private partnerships for water and sanitation in Colombia in 2004: 125 private and 48 mixed public-private water companies, including large, medium and small companies. Most of the contracts were awarded in poor municipalities with highly deteriorated infrastructure. They relied mainly on public funding, complemented by limited private funding. The design was based on the central government providing grants in the start-up years to rehabilitate deteriorated systems and to expand access, while the contracting municipal governments also made budgetary transfers on an annual basis to complement revenues. Colombia thus departed from the standard concession approach, which requires private concessionaires to finance investments with their own resources.

According to the World Bank, the key to success of private sector participation in the Colombian water sector has been the development of homegrown solutions, and, at times, skillfully adapting models used elsewhere to the particular circumstances and culture of Colombia.

== History ==
Private sector involvement in the Colombian water sector began in 1995 in Cartagena, with support from the World Bank. It was followed by a second contract in Barranquilla in 1996 and more concessions in the next years in Santa Marta, Tunja, Montería, Palmira, Girardot, and Riohacha. The first contracts followed mostly the mixed-ownership company model, with the municipality holding a majority of the shares but with management fully delegated to a private operator. In a "mixed-capital" company in which the service is jointly controlled by municipal governments and private "operating partners" operating partners must meet ambitious targets ensuring that coverage is extended to low-income areas quickly — sometimes before the current mayor concludes his term in office. In exchange they receive an annual management fee and a percentage of revenues. A second group of contracts started in 2001 with the implementation by the central government of the Enterprise Modernization Program (PME - Programa de Modernización de Empresas), which focused on turning around public water utilities in small cities and towns with high rates of poverty and poor network condition.

== Impact of private sector participation ==
Studies on the impact of private sector participation in Colombia show that it had a positive impact on service quality. There were also significant increases in access in a short time frame under private contracts. However, there are no conclusive results showing that access increased more rapidly under private contracts than in the case of public utilities. There has been a slight average reduction in water losses in privatized utilities. In at least one city (Cartagena), real tariffs declined substantially, indicating that the operator passed on efficiency gains to consumers. None of the studies showed negative impacts of water privatization on access, service quality, operational efficiency or tariff levels.

=== Impact on access ===
According to a study by the World Bank relying on data of Colombia's regulatory agency, private water projects in Colombia have performed well in expanding access. The study notes that progress achieved in Colombia for access to water supply and sewerage services is not due to water privatization per se, but must be credited to good performers in both the public and private sectors, and a national policy that fosters accountability and efficiency.

Successful public utilities include EAAB in Bogotá, which made strong progress in access over the last decade, reaching universal coverage. The performance of the public utility EPM in Medellín was comparable for expanding access to that of the largest PPP, that of Barranquilla. Colombia's nine largest and/or oldest PPPs, the two mixed-ownership companies in Barranquilla (serving 1.3 million people) and Cartagena (serving 1 million) also have good records in expanding access. That in Barranquilla made notable progress in both water supply and sewerage services: coverage rose from 86 percent to 96 percent for water and from 70 percent to 93 percent for sewerage (1997–2006). In Cartagena water supply coverage jumped from 74 percent to almost universal coverage, while sewer coverage went up from 62 percent to 79 percent (1996–2006). Cartagena achieved full water supply coverage despite a 50 percent jump in the size of its population during the same period, largely due to the arrival of poor rural migrants. Half a million people gained access and 60 percent of the new connections benefited families in the poorest income quintile. To achieve universal coverage, the operator in Cartagena made extensive use of community bulk-supply schemes that provide safe water to the many illegal settlements that were expanding on the city's periphery.

In Santa Marta, water coverage improved rapidly during the first three years, going from 74 percent to 87 percent, but has stagnated since 2001 (access to sewerage followed the same pattern). In Palmira (220,000) and Girardot(100,000), full coverage was achieved for both water and sewerage. In the city of Tunja (120,000 people) both water and sewer coverage went up from 89 percent in 1996 at the start of the concession to 100 percent four years later. The company Conhydra in the department of Antioquia achieved full water coverage within a few years in the towns of Marinilla, Santafe, and Puerto Berrio (combined population 170,000) starting from levels of 80 – 90 percent.

The first contract under the PME program was awarded in 2000 in Montería (350,000 people). Starting from a low 63 percent, water coverage had increased to 96 percent by 2007, catching up with the national urban average. The population with access to piped water more than doubled. The improvement in sewer coverage was more modest, up from 26 percent to around 40 percent. In Soledad (400,000 people), coverage went up from 65 percent to 84 percent for water, and from 36 percent to 73 percent for sewerage in just five years.

=== Impact on water losses ===
The evolution of the water losses - as measured by Non-revenue water - for the nine largest and/or oldest PPP projects shows a mixed record. Strong gains were made in Montería, Tunja, Marinilla, and Palmira, but the reduction was modest in Cartagena, Barranquilla, and Santa Marta, and no progress was achieved in Girardot or Soledad. Reductions were achieved while the average network pressure went up significantly as service continuity was reestablished, which would have increased losses if no improvements had been made in the hydraulics of the distribution networks.

=== Impact on efficiency ===
In the case of Cartagena, the World Bank has estimated efficiency gains by comparing the evolution of the ratio of collected revenues to operational costs (operating ratio) on the one hand to that of the average tariff level on the other hand. The operating ratio is driven essentially by two factors: the evolution of operational costs and collection rates, which are controlled by the private operator, and the evolution of the average tariff, which is exogenous. Whenever the operating ratio increases faster than the tariff, efficiency gains are taking place. The Cartagena privatization achieved significant improvements in efficiency. This is reflected in the doubling over a decade (1995–2005) in the ratio of collected revenues to operational costs. At the same time, the average tariff was halved in real terms, suggesting that a significant portion of the savings achieved through efficiency gains was passed to customers.

=== Other impacts ===
Water rationing was less frequent in ten cities five years after the private sector became involved in providing services. Studies based on household and public health surveys show that private operators tend to achieve better potability figures than public water utilities.

== Local operators ==
The largest private water company in Colombia is Triple A (AAA), a Colombian company serving more than 1.5 million people. It has a strategic partnership with the publicly owned water utility of Madrid (Canal Isabel II). It is in practice managed by nationals and has been branding itself as a Colombian private company. The company was willing to focus on a market segment that other companies tend to avoid: the poorest cities. For example, in Barranquilla, more than 76 percent of AAA's customers are in the three lowest of six income segments used by the Colombian government. In Soledad, 98 percent of the population is in the three lowest segments, and poverty levels are similarly high in all the other municipalities where AAA operates. Other Colombian water operators are EIS, Conhydra and Sala.

Colombian construction companies that were active in the water sector were awarded PPP contracts following tenders in which only local investors participated. In all these cases, governments chose to ease prequalification criteria to increase competition, resorting to various mechanisms to ensure the winning bidder would be able to operate the water utility. In Colombia, the winning bidders contracted experienced technical staff (often former managers and engineers from public utilities). Between 2001 and 2004, Colombian investors won almost all the PPP contracts awarded in that country under the PME program.

== Example of Barranquilla ==
In 1996, more than 60 percent of Barranquilla's population had no water service at all or had it for only a few hours a day. The private operator was initially met with skepticism. When AAA began to install residential water meters in homes that had never had them, many consumers worried that the devices would result in big water bill increases. Opposition politicians like Guillermo Hoenisgberg initially opposed the private operator for ideological reasons, but later supported him. AAA earned the trust of its customers and political support by going to the poorest neighborhoods, interviewing thousands of people with the goal of understanding their expectations and assumptions regarding water and sanitation. The company then conducted a massive communications campaign with more than 40 staff, many of them social workers by profession, to work full-time in community outreach. Simultaneously, AAA adopted an aggressive external relations strategy that contrasts sharply with the cautious, low-profile approach preferred by water companies in many other Latin American cities. AAA runs elaborate public information campaigns in radio, television and the press. It also regularly hosts lunches and workshops for local journalists where company officials offer detailed explanations of the company's activities and answer questions.

Instead of installing meters and immediately sending out bills, AAA decided to use a gradual approach. In some cases the company would start by delivering water for free, and then bill new customers for 10 cubic meters of water per month, even if their actual consumption was far higher. After two months the fee would be based on 20 cubic meters, and after six months, it would be based on actual consumption. According to company officials, this approach relieved most consumers’ anxiety about the water meter and encouraged them to start monitoring their own consumption.

AAA also began to disconnect consumers who weren't paying, a potentially explosive issue. Many wealthy individuals and important companies were in the habit of ignoring water bills. And the notion of cutting off water to people in poor communities was obviously problematic. The company therefore developed a comprehensive system to facilitate and encourage payment among low-income customers, acknowledging the reality that many low-income families in Barranquilla live day-to-day on small amounts of cash earned from informal occupations. As a result, AAA has established partnerships with virtually all of Barranquilla's pawnshops that enable people to pay their water bill while conducting other transactions. Similar partnerships allow customers to pay their water bills at banks, department stores, grocery chains, and sports clubs through the city. Despite these measures, thousands of AAA's low-income customers still miss their payments each month, and thousands more have their water cut off when they go for two months without paying. To ensure that cutoffs are short-lived, every month AAA billing agents set up portable, outdoor "payment stations" in low-income neighborhoods. Local residents approach the stations and work out customized payment plans ("convenios de pago") with the agents. The plans allow customers to catch up on missed payments over several months, so long as they pay the current month's fee—and they result in immediate restoration of water service. AAA also developed a program to reward customers who consistently pay their bill. The program, known as "Supercliente" (super customer) awards modest prizes and certificates to customers who stay on top of their bill. As a result, billing efficiency increased from 66% in 1996 to 87% in 2004.

== See also ==
- Public utilities in Colombia
