= Water privatization in Cuba =

Water privatization in Cuba began in January 2000 when the socialist government of Cuba created a mixed public-private company to manage the water, sewer and stormwater drainage system in 8 of the 15 municipalities that make up the country's capital Havana. The government avoids the term privatization, despite the involvement of two foreign private companies as key partners in the mixed company. The company operates under a 25-year renewable concession contract. It serves 1.25 million inhabitants in the municipalities of Old Havana, Central Havana, Cerro, Plaza de la Revolución, 10 Octubre, La Lisa, Playa, and Marianao, which together are home to 60 percent of Havana's population. The company, called Aguas de la Habana, has a capital of 8 million USD and is owned by the Cuban state through the National Institute for Water Resources (INRH), the Spanish private company Aguas de Barcelona (Agbar) and the Spanish family firm Grupo Martinon. The contract foresees that ultimately the entire population of Havana will be served by the company.

The cooperation between the three companies goes back to a project undertaken in the Cuban tourist resort Varadero since 1994, involving Canaragua, the subsidiary of Aguas de Barcelona operating in the Canary Islands, and the firm Martinon whose owners also come from the Canary Islands. After this successful initial experience, Agbar and INRH signed a contract to operate the water services in three municipalities La Lisa, Playa and Marianao in Western Havana in 1997. Following this pilot project, the creation of the mixed company Aguas de la Habana was decided in a framework agreement signed in February 1999 in Barcelona.

Agbar "facilitated" 24.7 million USD of financing through loans. At least some of these loans are soft loans from the Spanish International Cooperation Agency, which financed the first ever major rehabilitation of the more than one century old Albear aqueduct that provides 12% of the capital's water supply. In addition to operating and maintaining the systems, Aguas de La Habana also carries out engineering studies and executes works.

The company's annual billing is US$ 9m for about 115 million cubic meters of water it delivers to its customers. As of 2004, Aguas de Barcelona reported significant progress. According to the company, 95 percent of the city's residents that had to be supplied by tanker trucks before the concession contract relied on tap water as of 2004. The continuity of supply had increased from 7 to 10 hours per day. However, as of 2010 progress was apparently slow, as water distribution losses are still estimated at 50% in 2010 and more than 100,000 inhabitants suffer from intermittent supply.

== See also ==
- Water supply and sanitation in Cuba
