= Water privatization in Armenia =

Water privatization in Armenia – or, more accurately, the participation of private companies in the provision of water supply under contract with the government of Armenia – has been prepared since the mid-1990s. The first management contract for water supply in Armenia, covering the capital Yerevan, was signed in 1999 with financial support from the World Bank. As of 2010, almost 2.1 million people or about two thirds of the population of Armenia, including its entire urban population, received their drinking water from private companies. Sanitation is not included in the private sector contracts and remains a public responsibility. The way water is handled in Armenia, with the involvement of water companies, carries significant influence on how the region will react to climate change and sustainability of water supplies. In recent years, climate change has appeared an additional issue for water resources in Armenia with affecting the management of privatized water services.

== Basics of management contracts ==
Under a management contract a private company provides specific services such as operating water systems as well as billing and revenue collection on behalf of the government. The private companies, however, do not own the revenues collected. They are being paid by the government through a fixed fee and a performance-based variable fee, so that there is no link between the level of tariffs and remuneration of the private company. The private companies are partially paid from the proceeds of loans and grants provided by external donors such as the World Bank, the Asian Development Bank and German aid. Investments are funded by external donors through soft loans provided to the government of Armenia.

== Situation before privatization ==
In the first half of the 1990s and in the aftermath of the demise of the communist system, the economy of Armenia had collapsed, with GDP declining by 50% and inflation reaching 5,000%. This resulted in many people not paying their water bills and a lack of maintenance of the water system. In Yerevan the collection efficiency was estimated to be only 45% in 1997 and had further declined to 19% in 1999. Unaccounted-for water was estimated at 72%. The average residential consumption was estimated at 250 liters per connection per day, twice as high as, for example, in Germany. Later it became clear that some of these figures had been seriously underestimated. For example, average residential consumption was found to be closer to 800 liters per connection per day. Tariffs were set at the equivalent of US$0.10 per cubic meter, which was insufficient to cover even operating costs. The situation outside the capital was similar or worse. Despite Armenia's abundant water resources, water supply was intermittent for most of the country. In Yerevan, water was provided for six hours a day on average. The financial burden of inefficiencies in Armenia's water sector to the government was estimated to be significant, amounting to 2.7% of Gross Domestic Product.

== Sector reform ==
Private sector participation in Armenia's water sector was accompanied by a comprehensive reform of the sector.

The reform process was initiated in 2000 shortly after the first management contract covering the capital Yerevan was signed. As a first step, water tariffs were increased. Then the utility in charge of Yerevan, and which was assisted by the private company under the management contract, was transformed from a government department subject to civil service rules to a publicly owned commercially oriented joint stock company. In 2002 a new Water Code was passed as the centerpiece of the reform process. A powerful State Committee for Water Economy (SCWE) was created as the main decision-making body for sector policies, except for tariff reviews. The next year an autonomous regulatory agency, the Public Services Regulatory Commission, was set up to review requests for tariff adjustments on the basis of objective criteria. These reforms were an important element in securing the benefits achieved in the sector. The first two years of the management contract in Yerevan prior to the reforms had been challenging, characterized by suspicion and even hostility between the government and the private company. After the reforms were implemented, the situation improved.

== Overview of contracts with private water companies ==
The private companies operate under three contracts with the government:

- A 10-year lease contract for the Yerevan Water and Sewerage Company, serving 1.1 million inhabitants. The contract is held by the French company Veolia Water. The contract, signed in 2005, was preceded by a 5-year management contract held by a consortium led by the Italian company Acea. A parallel investment program is being financed by the World Bank.
- A management contract for the service area of the Armenia Water and Sewerage Company (AWSC), serving 37 towns and 280 villages throughout the country with about 600,000 inhabitants. The contract was initially signed for a duration of 3 years in October 2004 and then extended by another 3 years. It is held by the French company SAUR International. The project is supported by the Asian Development Bank.
- A management contract, also for an initial duration of 3 years, for three regional water companies (Shirak, Lori and Nor Akunq) serving 5 towns and 37 villages with 375,000 inhabitants in the North of Armenia. The contract, signed in August 2009, is held by the German company MVV. The project is supported by German development cooperation through KfW development Bank.

== Objectives and impact ==
The main objectives of the management contracts are to increase the continuity of supply, metering and revenue collection, as well as to reduce water losses and energy consumption. Increasing access to piped water supply was not an objective of the contracts.

In Yerevan, the impact of the management contract from 1999 to 2005 was largely positive. In particular:

- Average continuity of water supply increased from about 7 hours to about 18.5 hours a day, and more than 70 percent of Yerevan's inhabitants received continuous service in 2005;
- Energy consumption decreased by about 48 percent, compared to a targeted decrease by 20 percent, as a result of using gravity powered water sources, increased efficiency and reduction in the number of booster pumps for high rise apartments;
- The share of connections with a water meter increased from 10 percent to 80 percent or 277,000 meters, far in excess of the contractual target of increasing the number of metered connections by 20,000;
- Collection efficiency – the share of bills paid compared to bills issued – increased from 19% (according to the World Bank) or 40% (according to the Asian Development Bank) to 80%.

Revenue collection and metering had remained low until the government passed the Water Code in 2002. The Code allowed utilities to partially forgive debt from unpaid bills in return for meter installation. Customers then paid the remainder of the unpaid bills in installments. Improved continuity of supply also helped customers to accept metering and tariff increases. The code also allowed cutting off non-paying customers. The improvement in collection efficiency and metering thus is not only due to private sector participation, but also to a change in government policy.

In the area served by the Armenia Water and Sewerage Company, within the first 2.5 years, the management contractor increased revenue collection by 24%; decreased energy costs by 15% and water losses by 20%. The number of metered connections was increased by 76%.

== Tariffs and affordability ==
In Yerevan the tariff was increased in 2000 from the equivalent of $0.10/m3 to Armenian Dram (AMD) 56 ($0.18)/m3 including value-added tax. In April 2004, in preparation for the lease contract, tariffs were increased to AMD 90.2 ($0.29)/m3 and again in May 2005, to AMD 125.1 ($0.40)/m3. In May 2006, the Public Services Regulatory Commission approved an overall tariff for Yerevan of AMD 172.8 ($.56)/m3, covering water and wastewater services. At the 2005 level, the average water bill accounts for 2.4% of the expenditures of an average household. The Government undertook a massive information campaign on the reasons for the tariff increases and the potential improvements in service that the management contract would bring.

== Regulation ==
On the basis of the Water Code, the State Committee of Water Systems (known formerly as the State Committee for Water Economy) in the Ministry of Territorial Administration is responsible for water policy within the Armenian government. It plans to transform all management contracts into longer-term lease contracts that confer more responsibilities to the private operators, following the example of Yerewan. Water tariffs are set by a semi-independent body, the Public Services Regulatory Commission.

== Corruption allegations ==
All three management contracts and the lease contract were awarded after international competitive bidding. There were allegations of corruption concerning a World Bank loan to improve water supply in Yerevan. However, an internal investigation of the World Bank found no evidence of such corruption.

== Water privatization and climate change ==
The climate changes are progressively affected by the privatization of water resources in Armenia. The rise in temperatures, a decline in precipitation and frequency of droughts has led to a lowering of river flows which supply up to 35 percent of the water in the country, sources like the Lake Sevan and ground water reserves and strained. Meanwhile, because of the decline of the infrastructure, water loss of up to 70 percent, increased household and industrial needs have complicated water management, especially in the presence of the private sector. In the future, climate forecasting predicts that the process of warming will continue. Balance between state management of water with the efficiency of the private sector becomes a main concern of the Armenian future water security.

The existing infrastructure challenges also worsen the water scarcity. For instance, the existing water supply infrastructure in Armenia was developed prior to the privatization period. As a result, there are inefficiencies in the infrastructure, such as water loss. In some areas, water loss are as high as 70 percent, mainly due to leakage and inefficient sustainability. Other climate changes, such as droughts and heatwaves further increase the issues. In Armenia, the reduction of water loss, is connected with management and investment steps, which in result is addressed through private sector involvement. This is however dependent on the management and regulatory environment. With the involvement of private operators, there are issues such as the pricing policies and the distribution of water resources.

On the other hand, water demand is also increasing in various sectors such as households, agriculture, and industry.Climate change also impacts this because it increases water demand in sectors such as agriculture during hot and dry seasons. Because of the decline in water supply, this has resulted in uneven water distribution amongst cities.

Climate adaptation may be supported by private sector participation. In the context of with climate conditions, private sectors may strengthen the systems through investments that modernize the infrastructures, improving the management, and increasing their efficiency. Privatization models have been commonly linked to the attempt to improve financial sustainability of water services. The issues of affordability and balanced access are raised, especially in case water tariffs rise or in case market-based strategies affect the distribution of resources.

Regulations and policies of the government also affect significantly the issue between water privatization and climate issues in Armenia. The distribution and management of water resources under the growing environmental pressure is affected by reforms like the Water Code (adopted in 2002, by the National Assembly of Armenia, being the fundamental law which governs the management of water systems) and the role of agencies in tariff establishment and control over the functioning of the individual operators. Proper regulation is necessary to balance between economic efficiency, the environment and equal water accessibility for everyone, especially as climate change pressures on the water structures in the country.

Looking forward, in the next few decades, by the climate forecast, Armenia is expected to undergo warming and rising pressure on water resources. This image can outline the importance of merged water resource management. The balance between state control and efficiency of the private sector is likely to become a major concern of the country to address the issues of future climate and water security.
