= Water privatization in Albania =

Water privatization in Albania was initiated by the Albanian government in the early 2000s with the support of the World Bank and German development cooperation. The stated objective was to improve the quality and efficiency of urban water supply and sanitation. At the time, many households received water only for a few hours every day, utilities were overstaffed, water tariffs were low and many customers did not pay their water bills. There was no single municipal wastewater treatment plant in the country of 3 million, which is among Europe's poorest countries. In 2002-03 three contracts were signed with foreign private operators covering six secondary cities. Water privatization never covered more than a fifth of the country’s population. The contracts expired or were terminated early five years later with few tangible improvements in service quality.

== Situation before privatization ==
Much of the water and sewerage infrastructure in Albania was built between the 1950s and early 70s with help from the People’s Republic of China. When Chinese aid ended in 1978 after the two communist governments fell out with each other, the infrastructure deteriorated with little or no maintenance. The responsibility for water supply rested with the central government with no participation by local governments and communities. With the fall of communism in the 1992 elections, the provision of water supply and sanitation services was assigned to 52 state-owned regional water enterprises in an effort to empower local government. Typically, the service area of a regional water enterprise comprises several municipalities. The mayors of Albania's 373 municipalities (Albanian: bashki or komunë) nominate the members of the management councils of the regional water company which serves their territory.

However, all important decisions about investments and staffing actually continued to be taken by the central government, so that local governments felt that they had no actual responsibility for water supply. Revenues were insufficient to cover even operating expenses, and electricity bills or even salaries went unpaid unless the central government provided subsidies. Investments picked up with Western aid after 1992, but service quality continued to remain poor.

About 70% of all water produced was non-revenue water and only 30% was billed. Only 70% of these bills were actually paid, so that ultimately only 21% of the water produced was actually paid for. Furthermore, the regional water and sewer companies had about three times more staff per connection than in other Eastern European and Central Asian utilities. Low revenues and high costs led to an average operating cost recovery rate of only 60%. On all these counts, the performance of Albanian water companies was much lower than the performance of utilities in other former communist countries ten years after the beginning of the transition process. Concerning service quality, on average water was available only 3–4 hours per day. Certain areas received water only once in three days, which was partly due to intermittent power supply for pumps. There was no wastewater treatment. Sewers were often clogged causing seepage and cross-contamination with drinking water. Many covers for manholes were missing so that they filled with rubbish.

== Reforms ==
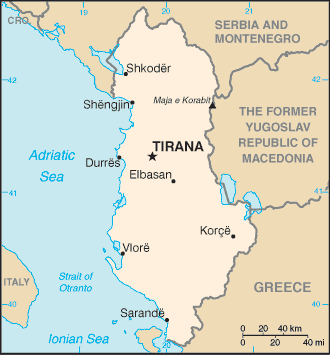
Map of Albania showing three provincial cities - Elbasan, Durrës and Sarandë - out of six whose water supply has been privatized in 2002–03.

The reform strategy for the urban water and sanitation sector included three main elements: decentralization, private sector participation and increased cost recovery. The reforms were decided and implemented by governments under socialist Prime Ministers that ruled from 1997 to 2005. The reform process was supported by German development cooperation and the World Bank with financing and technical assistance. The government also decided that 6 companies would enter into public-private partnerships with foreign companies through 3 contracts. Water privatization thus never covered more than a fifth of the country’s population. The water supply for the capital Tirana was not privatized.

In 1998 the government instructed 18 of the 52 regional water enterprises to transform themselves into joint stock companies whose shares were held by the central government. However, in 2000 the government passed the "Law on Organization and Functioning of Local Governments, No. 8652" which gave the exclusive responsibility for water supply and sanitation to the municipalities. Thus the government sent what appears to be contradictory signals: keeping the shares of joint stock companies in the hands of central government, while passing the responsibility for the sector to the municipalities.

It is thus perhaps not surprising that the transformation of regional water companies to joint stock companies was slow: as of 2003 only 10 had completed the transformation and the by-laws necessary for the implementation of the local government law were not yet issued. The continued strong role of central government is shown by the fact that in the privatization process the central government, and not local governments, selected the private companies and signed the contracts with them.

=== Elbasan concession ===
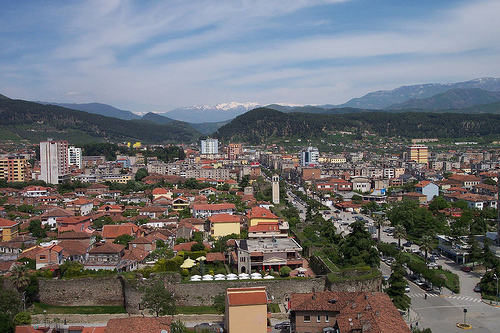
In the central Albanian city of Elbasan the first private sector water supply contract in Albania was signed.

The first private sector contract, a 30-year concession for Elbasan, took effect in April 2002. It was awarded to Berlinwasser International. It was supported by German development cooperation, which was to finance 70% of investment while the remainder was to be financed by the private concessionnaire. The contract had been negotiated between Berlinwasser and the Albanian government since 1999, when it had been expected the contract would be signed in 2000.

=== Kavajë management contract ===
The second contract, a 4-year management contract for the Kavajë district, took effect in early 2003. The contract was meant to “prepare the ground for more substantial private sector participation at a later stage.” It was awarded to Aquamundo and was also financed by German development cooperation. Aquamundo was initially a joint venture owned by ABB, Bilfinger Berger and MVV Energie, the utility that serves the German city of Mannheim. However, according to other sources Aquamundo was two third-owned by the Saudi Arabian Amiantit Company, through its subsidiary AmiWater, when it signed the contract. According to the company website, Aquamundo has only been part of Amiantit Company since 2004.

The objectives were to introduce continuous water supply, reduce water losses and increase bill collection. Furthermore, the contract included the construction and operation of the first wastewater treatment plant in Albania.

=== Four cities management contract ===
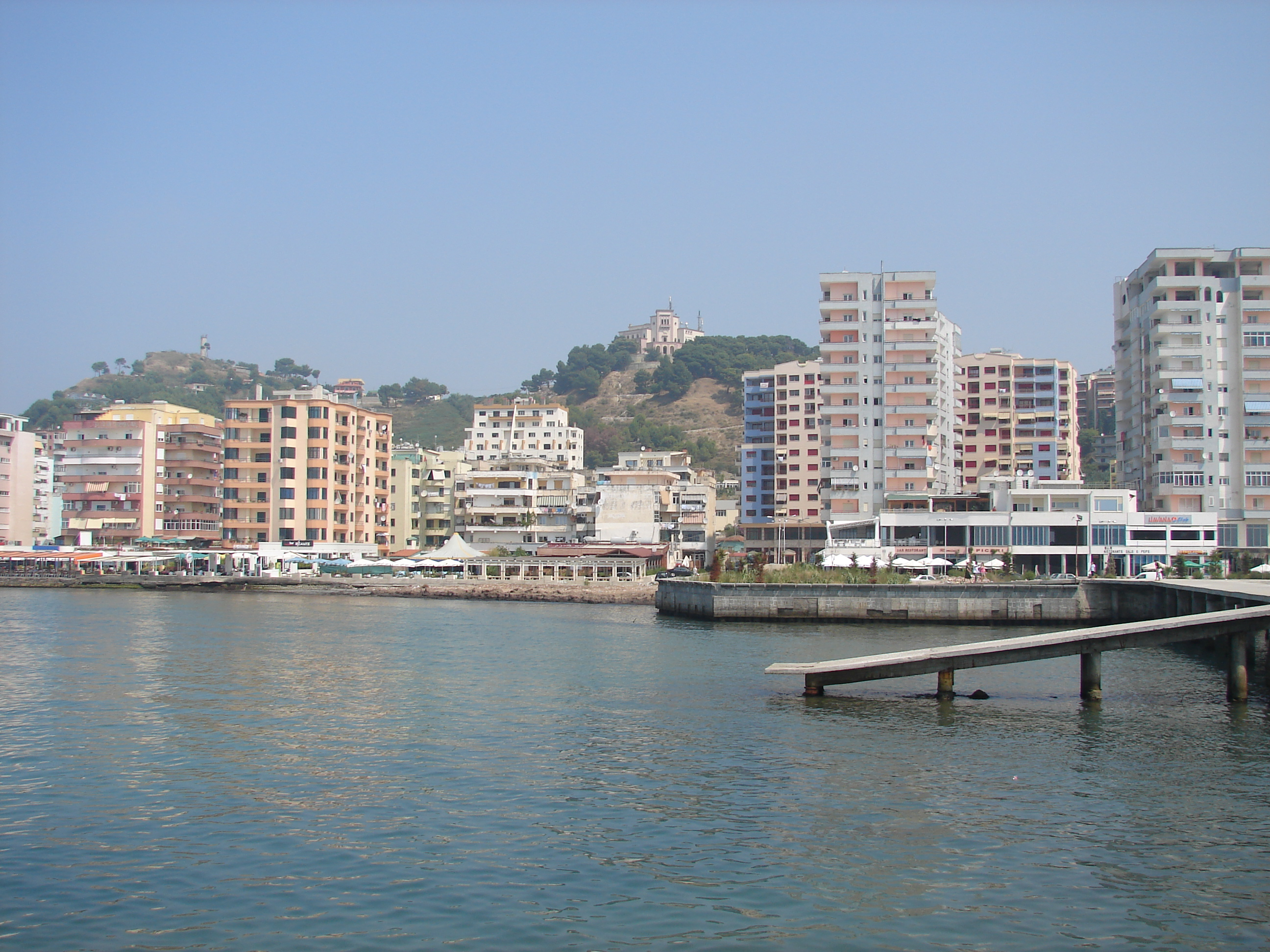
In the port city of Durrës where the water supply system was run by a private company from 2003 to 2008, continuity of water supply stagnated at 2-3 hours per day, short of the modest target of 6 hours per day.

The third contract, a 5-year management contract for the districts of Durrës, Fier, Lezhë and Sarandë, took effect in June 2003. It was financed by the World Bank. The objectives of this contract were to increase the continuity of water supply, to improve water quality, to increase bill collection and cost recovery. It was signed with Berlinwasser International, but Aquamundo was involved as a subcontractor.

== Impact ==
There is little public information available about the impact of the privatization in Elbasan and Kavajë. However, the World Bank has published detailed information on the impact of the four cities concession in the completion report for the project that financed the management contract.

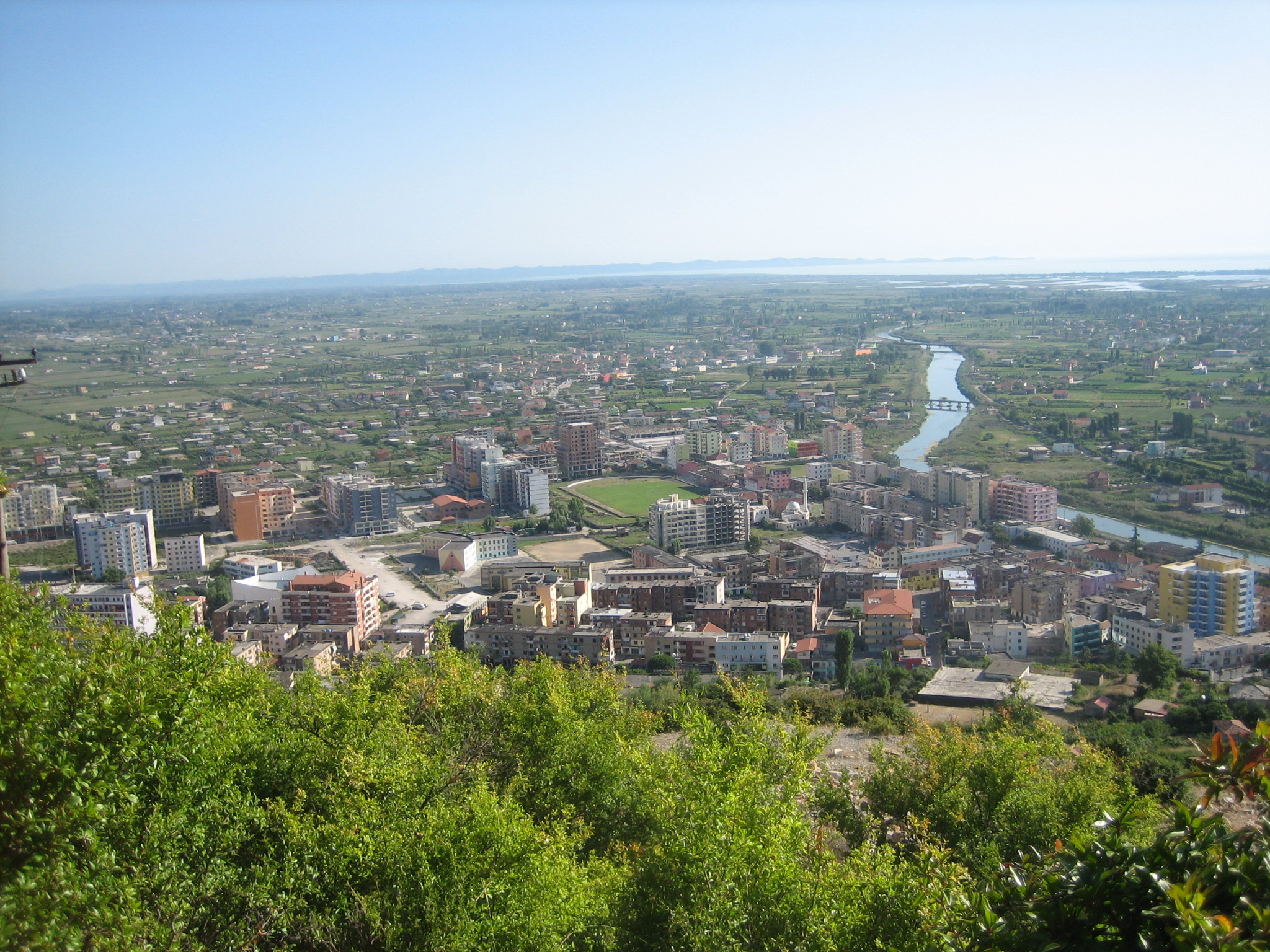
In the city of Lezhë the compliance with drinking water quality standards increased from 55% to almost 100% during the management contract. However, cost recovery remained poor.

Service quality. The continuity of supply in Fier and Sarandë increased significantly, but it remained unchanged at a low level of 2–3 hours per day in Durrës and equally unchanged at a high level of 20 hours per day in Lezhë. Water quality compliance improved markedly in Lehzë and Sarandë; it had already been good in the other two cities.

Cost recovery. Financial indicators for the four utilities had been below the Albanian average at the beginning of the management contract, although the Albanian average was already below the average of other formerly communist countries. From this dismal starting point the collection efficiency and cost recovery improved somewhat, but remained far from satisfactory: Collection efficiency was 56-81% and operating cost recovery 40-60% at the beginning of the contract. The objective of 79% collection efficiency was reached in only one city, while the objective of operation cost recovery was not reached in any city despite tariff increases. Residential water tariffs almost doubled in two cities and almost tripled in the other two between 2002 and 2008. They were 15-20 Lek per cubic meter in 2002 (11-15 Euro Cent) and stood at 35-43 Lek (29-36 Euro Cent) in 2008. In order to protect the poor from tariff increases, the Government supported the four municipalities to test a free basic water policy. Low-income metered households were to be provided 20 liters per capita per day free of charge beginning in 2004. However, the policy was difficult to implement, because metering is a precondition for free basic water and only about 20% of residential customers were metered. Without free basic water, a tariff of 40 Lek per cubic meter corresponded to about 3% of the income of a poor household in 2006.

Supervisory Boards of the utilities retained ultimate authority for key decisions such as staffing. This limited the control of the private operator over key decisions, making it more difficult to achieve the objectives.

== Remunicipalisation ==
The Elbasan concession with Berlinwasser was terminated early in 2007 in mutual agreement, while the management contracts expired in 2007 and 2008 without being renewed. The responsibility for water supply and sanitation reverted to the municipal utilities.

== See also ==
- Water privatization
