= Water privatization in Morocco =

Water privatization in Morocco goes back to the times of the French Protectorate when most water supply systems were run under a private concession. After independence the private utility was nationalized, but in the mid-1990s the Moroccan government privatized water and sewer services again, alongside electricity distribution, in four cities. The privatization process began with the award of the Casablanca concession to Lyonnaise des Eaux (now SUEZ) in 1997, followed by the award of a concession for the capital Rabat in 1998 and the award of another concession for Tangiers and Tetouan to Veolia Environnement. In 2009 private companies provided water and sanitation services to 38% of the urban population of the country.

== History ==
At the time of the French protectorate of Morocco beginning in 1912 the water supply of Casablanca, Rabat, Salé, Tangiers and Meknes was provided by the French private company Société Marocaine de Distribution d'eau, de gaz et d'électricité (SMD), a subsidiary of Lyonnaise des Eaux, under concession contracts. These contracts were terminated when Morocco became independent in 1956, at which time municipal public utilities became responsible for water supply and electricity distribution in the major cities of the Kingdom.

Casablanca. In the early 1990s the municipal public utility Régie Autonome Intercommunale de Distribution d'Eau et d'Electricité de Casablanca (RAD) had a poor service record. Therefore, "after the direct intervention of King Hassan" the government decided in the mid-1990s to bring in a private company to manage the city's water, sewerage and power networks. Lyonnaise des Eaux under its CEO Jérôme Monod, a close adviser of Jacques Chirac, negotiated the contract with the Interior Ministry under Driss Basri. The lengthy negotiations process for the contract was accompanied by intense criticism from the press, the Moroccan trade association Confédération Générale des Entreprises du Maroc, and city councilors. Finally a consortium led by Lyonnaise des Eaux (now SUEZ), was awarded the 30-year concession without a competitive tender. Lyonnaise des Eaux thus returned to a city where it had already provided services for almost half a century. The consortium was called Lydec and originally included Lyonnaise des Eaux (35%), Elyo (24%), Agbar (5%), EdF (18%) and Endesa (Spain) (18%). The contract was signed on April 28, 1997, between Jérôme Monod, CEO of Lyonnaise des Eaux, and Abdelmoughit Slimani, President of the Council of Greater Casablanca (Communauté Urbaine de Casablanca).

In 2008 the concession contract was renegotiated to provide a better balance between the two partners, limiting the rate of return of the concessionnaire from 14.6% to 11.7% and requiring him to increase his investments by Dirham 1bn. Also, automatic tariff increases will now be limited to specific situations such as increases in bulk water or electricity tariffs.

Rabat. After direct negotiations in 1998, a concession for Rabat was signed in January 1999 with REDAL, a company consisting of a Portuguese partner (Electrocidade), a Spanish company (Urbaser) and a Moroccan company (Alborada). The concession met with problems from the very beginning. According to a presentation by Moroccan government officials, "the firm was not ready" the four partners were not coordinated, the start-up was slow contractual obligations were not fulfilled leading to tumultuous meetings, contestation of bills and protests. As a result, the founding shareholders transferred their equity in REDAL to Vivendi Environnement.

Tangiers and Tetouan. The concession in Tangiers and Tetouan covering 23 municipalities with 1.1 million inhabitants was awarded in January 2002 after competitive bidding. Seven bids were received, of which one was discarded for non-conformity. The six offers included groups led by Lyonnaise des Eaux (France), Enron (USA), Thames Water (UK), Union Fenosa (Spain) SAUR (France) and Vivendi (France). The bids were evaluated on the basis of technical and financial criteria combined in a single score. The contract was awarded to the group led by Vivendi, which used the brand name Amendis. The formal name of the group is Société des eaux et d'électricité du Nord (SEEN), consisting of Vivendi, Hydro-Québec International (Canada) and ONA (Morocco).

== Regulation ==
The public counterparts (delegating authorities) of the concessions in Morocco are the municipalities. Each delegating authority has set up a technical committee to regulate the contracts, comprising representatives of the municipality, the Ministry of Interior and the concessionnaire. The committee reviews work plans and reports. In addition, about one year after the contracts in Casablanca and Rabat were signed local supervisory commissions were set up. Also, a supervisory commission was created at the national level. As of 2002, the government concluded that the members representing the delegating authority in the technical committee in Casablanca felt constrained by a lack of expertise compared to the specialists from the private concessionnaire. On the other hand, the concessionnaire felt that there was interference in the management of the services. This improved somewhat after the local supervisory commission was set up in Casablanca. This experience influenced the design of the concession contracts in Tangiers and Tetouan where clauses to protect consumers were added and local supervisory commissions were included in contract design from the beginning.

== Investment ==
Lydec's 30-year investment plan totals 30 billion Moroccan Dirham. According to one source 21 billion of this sum will come from connection fees paid by new customers into a fund, 8.2 billion would come from Bank loans and internal cash generation, and 0.8 billion would be in the form of equity to be raised by the subsidiary running the concession. According to another source the concessionnaire will not provide any significant equity, nor will it borrow significant debt. Instead it will generate 87.8% of its contribution of 6.3 billion Dirham by using its technical and commercial know-how to mobilize funding from its customers. The remainder would be mobilized through connection fees. According to Lydec, the company invested 7.7 billion Dirham between 1997 and 2008, of which the company financed 4.4 billion. 33% of the investment was for sanitation, 23% for water supply, 34% for electricity and 10% were investments that benefited all three sectors. A substantial share of the investments in sanitation were dedicated to storm water management.

== Outcomes ==
Casablanca. According to Lydec, surveys show that more than 90% of its customers have noticed improvements: shorter waiting time at customer centers, simplified procedures, quicker repairs, more reliable billing and less inundations. In particular, Lydec built the Western collector, a 4.7 km underground stormwater drain with a capacity of 40 m3/s. Also, the company says that it saved 25 million cubic meters of drinking water in 2002 compared to the situation before the concession.

Other cities. According to Amendis, during the first five years of its concession in Tangiers and Tetouan it expanded the wastewater collection and treatment system in the two cities and provided 40,000 subsidized water and wastewater connections. The level of non-revenue water has been reduced from 32% in 2002 to 19% in 2008 in Rabat, and from 41% to 21% in Tangiers, according to Veolia.

== Tariffs ==
Casablanca. According to the Casablanca concession contract, tariffs are adjusted annually based on a price index defined in the contract. If the resulting tariff increase is less than 3% it is applied automatically. If it is more than 3% the private company and the state decide about the measures to be taken. If no decision is taken within two months, the company can apply a 3% tariff increase while the contracting parties decide about how to deal with the remaining tariff increase. Increases in bulk water tariffs and in electricity production tariffs are passed on automatically to consumers, based on the principle "no loss, no gain". Between 1997 and 2001 the average water tariff in Casablanca increased by 35% and the average sewerage tariff by 34%. However, the electricity tariff decreased by 6%. During public management by RAD water tariffs had increased by 60% between 1990 and 1995. However, this increase had to a large extent been due to an increase in bulk water tariffs charged by ONEP to RAD.

Other cities. Concerning the concessions by Veolia, tariff increases in the 2007–10 period were lower than contractually required, according to Veolia. The company claims that the government owes it Dirham 93 million (US$11.5 million) because of unimplemented tariff increases. Increases in the tariffs for bulk water supplied by the public company ONEP to the private companies, as well as increases in electricity tariffs, cannot automatically be passed on to consumers.

== See also ==
- Water supply and sanitation in Morocco
