= Water privatization in Honduras =

Water privatization in Honduras has been limited to the city of San Pedro Sula which has signed a 30-year concession contract with a private operator. Two other cities, Puerto Cortes and Choloma, have introduced an interesting management model that cannot be characterized as either private or public. They have created mixed companies without the involvement of a private company. Instead, the majority of shares in the municipal company are held by cooperatives, unions and the local business association, with a minority ownership by the municipality. (see Water supply and sanitation in Honduras#The case of Puerto Cortes)

In San Pedro Sula, the country's economic capital, the municipality has given a concession to a private operator for 30 years in 2000. As a result, between 1999 and 2003 the number of homes with residential water service in San Pedro Sula increased from 84 percent to 93 percent, thanks to the installation of 13,600 new connections. The proportion of tap water receiving proper treatment rose from 22 percent to 80 percent. Water pressure and continuity increased throughout the system.

The municipality receives additional revenue through a 5% surcharge paid by the concessionaire. According to ESA Consultores, an independent consulting firm in Tegucigalpa, rates in San Pedro Sula are among the lowest in all Central America. On the other hand, tariffs did increase compared to the very low level prior to the concession and residents in poor neighborhoods complain that their service is still far from satisfactory.

The process to award the concession included extensive consultations. A ‘Municipal Transparency Commission’ was created, made up of representatives of civil society, including labor unions, the Dutch consul in Honduras, the Catholic Church and a local university, to oversee the process. The municipal council carefully reviewed all of the documents, at each stage of the process. Three international consortia offered formal bids for the concession. To make sure that the process was transparent, the municipality decided to award the concession based on a single criterion: the lowest water tariff. The bids were opened in public and the concession was awarded to a group of Italian companies called Aguas de San Pedro, headed by Acea which runs water and sanitation systems for the city of Rome. Not only was the tariff offered by this group the lowest, but it was lower than the tariff charged by the municipal water company at the time.

The concession contracts foresees the installation of meters, the expansion of the sewer system and the construction of wastewater treatment plants. The concessionaire committed itself to undertake investments of US$ 208 million over the 30-year concession period. Investments have been partially financed by a US$ 13.7 million loan from the Inter-American Development Bank approved in 2002.

Despite efforts at community outreach and despite the improvements mentioned above, the concessionaire was met with a lot of suspicion by residents of poor neighborhoods, especially when meters were installed. Residents who were used to leave their taps open until water comes suspected that meters counted air and refused water bills that went up after meters were installed. Unlike in Puerto Cortes, no independent municipal regulatory entity was created. Instead a municipal department to monitor concession contracts was created, but it lacked autonomy from the municipal government.

== See also ==
- Water supply and sanitation in Honduras
- Water privatization
