= Water privatisation in South Africa =

Overview of delegation of water services in South Africa

Delegation of Water services in South Africa is a contentious issue, in the first place due to the confusion between "delegation of service" and Water privatisation, and in second place given the history denial of access to water and persisting poverty. Delegation of water service has taken many different forms in South Africa. Since 1996 some municipalities decided to involve the private sector in water and sanitation service provision through short-term management contracts, long-term concessions and contracts for specific services such as wastewater treatment. Most municipalities continue to provide water and sanitation services through public utilities or directly themselves. Suez of France, through its subsidiary Water and Sanitation Services South Africa (WSSA), and Sembcorp of Singapore, through its subsidiary Silulumanzi, are international firms with contracts in South Africa. According to the managing director of Silulumanzi "the South African water market is still in its infancy and municipalities are unsure of how to engage the private sector."

== Cases of water privatisation ==
=== Dolphin Coast (iLembe) ===
In January 1999, the Siza Water Company (SWC), then part of the French SAUR Group, became the first private company to manage a water and wastewater utility in South Africa. Under a groundbreaking 30-year concession contract, SWC assumed responsibility for providing water and sanitation services to what was then known as the Borough of Dolphin Coast, a locality in the iLembe District Municipality with a permanent population estimated at 34,000 located about 50 kilometres (31 mi) north of Durban. The privatisation was welcomed and supported by the city council and senior government officials, including President Thabo Mbeki who visited the area to sanction the process. The Development Bank of Southern Africa and the Municipal Infrastructure Investment Unit supported the development and completion of the concession arrangement by providing technical and advisory services during the conception and contract development phase. This helped to make this option understandable and financially feasible. SWC is a local company formed by Saur International of France (which holds a 58% share), four other companies and company employees. After initial difficulties the contract was renegotiated in 2001, including a substantial reduction in investment requirements and the provision of free basic water. A more accurate billing and collection system has led to an increase in revenues of 68%, while tariffs were increased by about 30% and the number of customers increased by 6%. In May 2007, SWC became a subsidiary of the British firm Cascal N.V. and in October 2012 it became part of the Sembcorp group from Singapore.

=== Nelspruit (Mbombela) ===
In 1999 the municipality of Nelspruit in Mpumalanga (ex-East Transvaal) signed a 30-year concession with the Greater Nelspruit Utility Company (GNUC), a subsidiary of Cascal, itself part of the British firm Biwater. The concession serves 350,000 people in Nelspruit and neighboring townships. GNUC subsequently changed its name to Silulumanzi. In July 2010 it was sold to Sembcorp of Singapore. According to the private concessionnaire, in the first two years of the concession thousands of unregistered connections were found and many household and mains leaks repaired. The savings have enabled water delivery to other areas not previously supplied. Over 8,000 broken meters have been replaced and a further 15,000 new meters have been installed to provide new house connections and formalise existing unauthorised supplies. Total daily water supplied into distribution fell from 66,000 to 60,000 cubic metres (2.3 to 2.1 million cubic feet), despite an increase of over 30% of customers supplied. This was achieved by reducing non-revenue water. Traditional political protests had involved non-payment of water bills so that a change in culture was required. Facilitators have worked in the villages and townships educating, discussing and encouraging the regular payment of water and sewage bills. Besides meetings with elected representatives, they engage in street theatre and sports sponsorship. Also local offices have been established throughout the concession area to provide easy access for customers to pay their bills, raise queries, deal with complaints and report leaks. As a result, revenue collection has substantially improved. Furthermore, the portion of households with access to basic water supply increased from 52% in 1999 to 88% in 2009. In formalised urban areas, 24-hour supply has been extended to 82% of households, up from 37% in 1999.

=== Johannesburg ===
In January 2001, the city of Johannesburg established the municipal company Johannesburg Water and subsequently signed a management contract with Water and Sanitation Services South Africa (WSSA), a joint venture between Suez (ex-Lyonnaise des Eaux), its subsidiary Northumbrian Water Group and the South African company Group 5. The contract was not extended when it expired in 2006.

=== Other cases ===
In 2003, WSSA also had a 25- year concession in Queenstown, Eastern Cape and provided water and wastewater services to over 2 million people in the provinces of Kwa-Zulu Natal (Dolphin Coast), Eastern Cape (including in Stutterheim), Western Cape, Limpopo and Gauteng.

== See also ==
- Water supply and sanitation in South Africa
