= Water supply and sanitation in Cuba =

Data
- Access to an improved water source: 95% (2015)
- Access to improved sanitation: 93% (2015)
- Average urban water and sanitation tariff (US$/m^{3}): 0.04
- Share of household metering: Very low

Institutions
- Decentralization to municipalities: Yes
- National water and sanitation company: Yes (not for service provision)
- Water and sanitation regulator: None
- Responsibility for policy setting: Various ministries
- Sector law: None
- No. of urban service providers: 140 (?)

Water supply and sanitation in Cuba is characterized by a high level of access. A state-owned enterprise is in charge of providing services throughout the country within the country's socialist, centrally planned Cuban economic system. As a surprising exception in a Socialist country, a mixed public-private company with partial foreign ownership provides services in parts of Havana.

== Access ==
In 2015 about 95% of Cubans had access to an improved water resource (96% of the urban population, but only 92% of the rural population). Cuba's access to adequate sanitation is the second-highest in Latin America and the Caribbean after Uruguay. Access to improved water supply in Cuba, however, is the same as the average for the region.

== Service quality ==
There is no systematic information on the quality of water and sanitation services in Cuba.

=== Drinking water and impact of droughts ===
In July 2015, President Raúl Castro called for water rationing throughout the country due to drought conditions influenced by the El Niño phenomenon. in November 2015, Cuban authorities announced a national program to combat the effects of drought, including large investments and measures to conserve water. In April 2016 INRH said that water levels in reservoirs in Eastern Cuba were at their lowest levels in a decade. Fourteen reservoirs in the western Artemisa Province close to Havana also had low water levels. Some 120,000 people in Havana are dependent on water tanker trucks because of low water levels in reservoirs.

In 2002 in Santiago de Cuba in the East of the island residents went without tap water for as much as 20 days. Water was not reliably chlorinated, partly due to the unavailability of chlorine. As a result, residents received water that was not safe to drink and had to store it in their homes, which further increased the risk of contamination. Some households had to resort to sand filters to treat water in their homes.

In 2000 between 90,000 residents of Havana had to receive water in tanker trucks, because the antiquated water supply system was unable to provide them with water. Since then, the system has been repaired and this number has been reduced, at least until it increased again during the 2015-16 drought.

=== Wastewater treatment ===
According to a 2006 report by the “Commission for Assistance to a Free Cuba” to the US president there are only five wastewater treatment plants in Cuba, and all of them are “inoperative”. They provide “some degree of treatment” to only four percent of collected wastewater, the remainder being discharged without treatment.

== Policy ==
2013 the Cuban National Assembly approved a National Water Policy with four main objectives: (i) rational and productive use of available water resources; (ii) efficient use of infrastructure (rehabilitation and maintenance); (iii) the management of risks associated with water quality; and (iv) the management of risks associated with extreme climatic events. In particular, the policy foresaw the decentralization of water services. Of 14 provincial assemblies, 10 supported the proposal or at least did not express opposition to it, while four considered it "improper ('improcedente') in the current conditions."

== Responsibility for water supply and sanitation ==
=== National Water Resources Institute ===
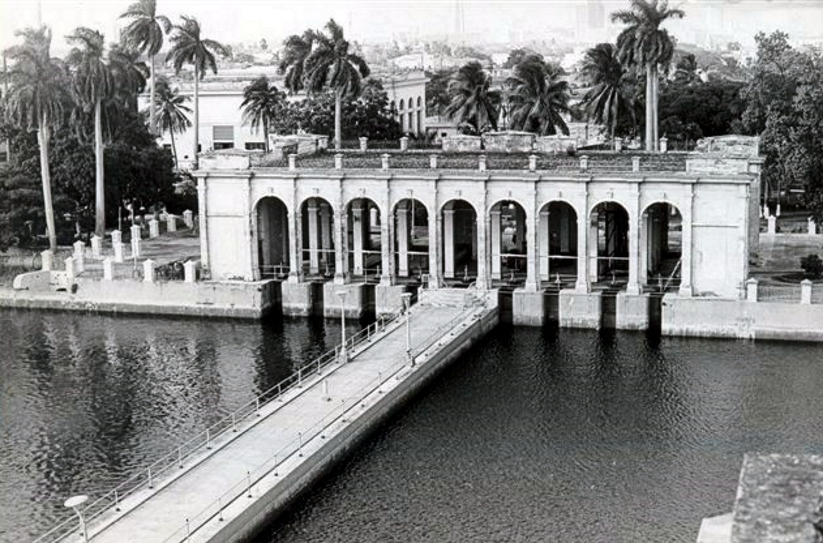
los depósitos de Palatino: water reservoir in Havana

The National Water Resources Institute (Instituto Nacional de Recursos Hidraulicos, INRH) is in charge of “directing, executing and controlling the application” of the government's water resources activities. In addition to its attributions in water resources management, it is also in charge of setting norms for and controlling activities in water supply and sanitation. De facto it also provides water supply and sanitation services through “enterprises” that are part of the INRH group. INRH also operates 241 dams and 175 small hydropower plants with an installed total capacity of 14 MW.

INRH proposes water and sanitation policies to the Cabinet. Ministries involved in the sector include the Ministry of Economy and Planning (investment planning), the Ministry of Health (monitoring water and wastewater quality), the Ministry of Financing and Prices (setting of recurrent cost budgets and tariffs) and the Ministry of Construction (construction of infrastructure through water and sanitation construction brigades).

INRH was created in 1989, taking the place of an entity bearing the same name that was created in 1962. In 2000 it was restructured to reflect a focus on “business management”, which involved the creation of business units. The INRH group now includes 4 enterprise groupings and 5 independent enterprises. One of the enterprise groupings covers 19 regional water and sanitation companies. Another one includes a range of construction companies, and one groups engineering design companies. All these “enterprises” are state-owned enterprises within the socialist, centrally planned Cuban economic system.

=== Local government ===
Service provision is the responsibility of the country's 14 provinces and 140 municipalities through their respective water and sanitation directorates, except in the case of 12 municipalities in Habana. The capital Havana is administratively divided in 15 municipalities, but has a single mayor.

There are 3,220 rural water systems in Cuba.

=== Private sector participation: Aguas de la Habana ===
One of the "independent enterprises" in the INRH group actually is a mixed public-private company with partial foreign ownership from the Spanish company Aguas de Barcelona (Agbar). The company, called Aguas de la Habana, provides water and sanitation services in 12 of the capital's 15 municipalities under a 25-year contract signed in 2000, while the infrastructure remain publicly owned. In addition to operating and maintaining the systems, it also carries out engineering studies and executes works. The company's annual billing is US$9m for about 115 million cubic meters of water it delivers to its customers.

== Efficiency ==
Non-revenue water in Havana, where half of the 330 million cubic meters supplied are unaccounted for, has been estimated at 50%. This is slightly higher than the Latin American average of 40% and about twice as high as non-revenue water in many developed countries.

== Tariffs ==
In Havana the residential water tariff is fixed at $1 Cuban peso (US$0.04) per cubic meter, one of the lowest water tariffs in Latin America. However, hotels and embassies are billed at $1 Cuban convertible peso (US$1) per cubic meter. Until 1997 there was no water tariff at all.

== See also ==
- Water privatization in Cuba
