= Water privatization in Algeria =

Water privatization in Algeria has been carried out in the country's four largest cities – Algiers, Annaba, Constantine and Oran – in 2005–08 through management contracts. Under a management contract a private company operates a water system for a defined period on behalf of a public authority and is remunerated through a fixed fee as well as a performance-based variable fee. In all four contracts the public partner is the local utility. The local utilities are all jointly owned by the national water holding company Algérienne de l'Eau and the national sanitation holding company ONA, which are both under the authority of the Ministry of Water Resources. The Minister of Water Resources, Abdelmalek Sellal, said in late 2011 that what is fundamental to the management contracts is not so much to ensure 24-hour water supply, but to "instill a new management culture" that regards water "as a commercial good that requires technological know-how and management skills".

In other Algerian cities publicly owned and managed utilities continue to provide water and sanitation services alone without the support of private companies. The government announced that it will decide in September 2012 whether management contracts should also be introduced in Sétif, Sidi Bel Abbès and Mostaghanem.

The World Bank provided technical assistance for the preparation of the privatization of the water and sanitation systems in Annaba, Constantine and Oran, all of which were awarded after competitive bidding. It has not been involved in the preparation of the privatization of Algiers, a contract that has been awarded without competitive bidding.

Algiers

In November 2005 Suez Environnement of France was directly awarded a Euro 113 million, 5.5 year-management contract for Algiers. The local contractual partner, the Algiers water and sanitation utility SEAAL, was only created in April 2006. The government provides US$500m for investments during the period of the management contract. The utility has 460,000 subscribers and 4,400 employees. The objectives of the management contract are to distribute good quality water on a continuous basis, to improve bathing water quality, to rehabilitate infrastructure and to improve customer satisfaction. As of January 2009 the continuity of supply has increased from 16% to 80%, 7 beaches were opened to the public and extensive training has been conducted. In 2011 continuity reached 99%. Customer satisfaction increased from 70% in 2007 to 89% in 2010. The management contract was renewed for another five years and extended to the province of Tipaza in September 2011.

Oran

In November 2007 Aguas de Barcelona from Spain, itself a subsidiary of Suez, was awarded a Euro 30m, 5.5 year-management contract for the city of Oran after competitive bidding. The operator began its work in April 2008. The contractual partner is the water and sanitation utility for Oran, SEAOR.

Annaba

In December 2007 Gelsenwasser from Germany was awarded a Euro 50 million 5.5 year- management contract for the city of Annaba. The contractual partner was the water and sanitation utility for the cities of Annaba and El Taref, SEATA. However, the investment program stalled and the government cancelled the contract in 2010. Gelsenwasser blamed the failure on slow procurement and a lack of means, while the Algerian authorities say the firm lacked the required expertise.

Constantine

In June 2008 the Société des Eaux de Marseille (SEM) of France, a subsidiary of Suez and Veolia, was awarded a Euro 28m 5.5 year-management contract for Constantine. A first bid had been unsuccessful. SEM had been the sole bidder when the contract was rebid. The contractual partner is the local water and sanitation utility SEACO. In 2010 the government said that SEM was behind schedule. According to Michel Valin, chief executive of SEACO, union disputes are a major challenge and technical issues are secondary to "getting his growing and increasingly young team to take ownership of the company."
