= Water privatization in Guayaquil =

Water privatization in Guayaquil began with the decision taken in 1995 to privatize drinking water supply and sewerage in Guayaquil, the largest city and economic capital of Ecuador, through a concession contract. In preparation for privatization, the previously separate water and sewer utilities were merged into a single utility in 1996. The new utility began a modernization process and began to improve its performance. In parallel, the international bidding for the concession was prepared by Banque Paribas as the international advisor and was supported by the Inter-American Development Bank. The latter made a loan that was signed in October 1997 conditional upon the decision to award a concession. The 30-year concession agreement between the city government and the private company Interagua was signed in 2001. The contract was "poor-friendly", requiring the private company to keep tariffs constant for the first five years and to connect new users in poor areas "at no cost". At the same time, the former municipal water and sewer utility ECAPAG became the regulatory agency for the new private utility. Interagua is a consortium led by the Spanish company Proactiva Medio Ambiente, which in turn is supported by the Spanish construction firm FCC and the French water company Veolia Environnement. In 2012 the regulator ECAPAG was transformed into the Municipal Public Drinking Water and Sanitation Company of Guayaquil in what may be a first step towards the municipalization of the concession.

== Financing and investments ==
The investments undertaken by the concessionaire are financed through retained earnings, the municipality and the State Bank of Ecuador. The government funds are deposited into a trust fund that the concessionnaire can only access under certain conditions. For the 2011-2016 period investments of US$ 380 million are expected to be financed by the concessionnaire (US$ 107.5 million), the municipality and the State Bank of Ecuador (US$ 150 million) as well as the national government and the proceedings of a tax called Special Improvement Contributions (Contribucion Especial de Mejoriamiento, CEM).

== Impact ==
Before the concession, 50% of the city had only 10 hours service per day. In parts of the city water was supplied only 2 to 4 hours per day, often at low pressure. Commercial and physical losses in water distribution, technically called non-revenue water, stood at a staggering 79 percent. Only 46 percent of water bills were actually collected. And only 26 percent of all connections were metered.

During its first five years the company brought 24 hours service to all the city and served an additional 55,000 families, mostly low income in the southern part of the city. Access to water supply increased from 64 percent in 2000 to 72 percent in 2003, and access to sewerage has grown from 46 percent to 55 percent during the same period. According to an article written by Interagua for public relations all the "formally developed areas" of the city had access to piped water at "reasonable pressure" in 2012. However, according to Interagua's own annual report 2009-2010, only an estimated 82 percent of the population (almost 2 million out of a population of 2.43 million) had access to piped water and 67 percent had access to sewerage in July 2010. In 10 years access to piped water supply thus increased from 64 to 82 percent. Customers who gained access to piped water supply were able to consume twice as much water while paying one fifth of what they paid before, when they had bought it from vendors distributing it in tankers. Tankers charged US$ 3.50 per cubic meter, while Interagua charges only 34 cents per cubic meter for the first 15 cubic meters per month.

The concessionaire also increased billing efficiency - the share of bills issued that are paid - to about 75 percent by 2003. The number of staff was reduced by 43 percent between 2001 and 2003. This brought the number of staff per 1,000 connections down to less than 3, a level that is consistent with international good practice for an efficient utility.

Some of the remaining challenges are fluctuating water pressure and high levels of non-revenue water, consisting of both physical and commercial water losses. This is shown by the reports of the independent technical auditor who reviews annually the performance of Interagua. While the report confirmed that in 2010 at least 95 percent of all customers received water at a pressure above the minimum pressure, defined as 5 meters of water column (0.5 bar) in the center of the city and 8 meters of water column (0.8 bar) in the North of the city, the report contained no data about pressure variations and maximal pressure. Interagua wants to achieve constant pressure throughout its service area by 2015 or 2016. In 2010 the level of non-revenue water was 62 percent. This level is much higher than the average in Colombia (49 percent) or in Peru (44 percent).

There have been complaints of poor water quality in marginal communities. Residents of Guasmo Sur complained of turbid, foul smelling water that is not fit for consumption and residents of Suburbio Oeste have struggled through both a hepatitis outbreak and periodic issues of decreased chlorine content/increased fecal content in the samples from their sector in 2004.

== Comparison with public water management in Quito ==
A 2006 study conducted for the Inter-American Development Bank came to the conclusion that compared to Quito, which is served by a publicly managed water utility, water quality was worse in Guayaquil, the poor had less access to piped water and water tariffs were higher. In terms of trends, the study concluded that between 1995 and 2005 "poor homes decreased their likelihood of having access to water in Guayaquil relative to Quito".
