= Water privatisation in Ghana =

Water privatisation in Ghana has been discussed since the early 1990s as a reaction to poor service quality and low efficiency of the existing urban water utility. The World Bank supported the process of private sector participation in the urban water sector from the beginning. After many tribulations a 5-year management contract was awarded in 2006. When the contract expired in 2011, the government decided not to extend it, saying that the private operator had not lived up to expectations.

== Preparation (1995-2005) ==
Water privatization in Ghana has been discussed since the early 1990s as a reaction to poor service quality and low efficiency of the existing urban water utility Ghana Water and Sewerage Corporation (GWSC), renamed Ghana Water Company Ltd. (GWCL) in 1999. The World Bank supported the process of private sector participation in the urban water sector from the beginning. Following preparatory studies and a national consultation workshop in 1995, the government opted for two 10-year lease contracts among 8 options, including the option to continue public sector operation. Critics argue that the workshop participants had been arbitrarily chosen, that the majority of participants were foreigners, that no local NGOs participated and that the public sector option had not been given due consideration. Furthermore, they argue that a single workshop was not sufficient to prepare such an important decision, that no major public debate had taken place and that the final decision should have been taken by Parliament. According to the decision made by the government, each of the two leases was to cover about half the cities and towns of Ghana. The private operators were expected to invest US$132 million from their own resources, corresponding to about one fourth of the total expected investments over the lease period. The contracts were expected to increase water production by 85%, connections by 50% and reduce non-revenue water from 52% to 25%. These expectations proved to be clearly unrealistic in retrospect.

In March 2000, the government of Ghana awarded a 30-year Build-Operate-Transfer (BOT) contract for one half of the country, including the capital Accra, to the US company Azurix, a subsidiary of Enron. However, the World Bank did not support the contract. The contract failed before operations began due to accusations of corruption and public opposition which led to the formation of the Coalition against Water Privatization.

In 2004, the World Bank's Board approved a credit of US$103 million for an "Urban Water Project", which was later turned into a grant. The Nordic Development Fund contributes another US$5 million, while the Government of Ghana provides the remaining US$12 million of the US$120 million project. The main objectives of the program, which was supposed to end in 2010 and has been extended until December 2015, are to significantly increase access to water supply in urban areas with an emphasis on improving the service for the urban poor; and restoring the long-term financial stability, viability, and sustainability of the GWCL. The World Bank also financed technical assistance and training. The project explicitly supported private sector participation.

== The management contract (2006-2011) ==
Between June 2006 and June 2011 the private operator Aqua Vitens Rand Ltd. (AVRL), a joint venture of the public Dutch company Vitens and the public South African company Rand Water, supports GWCL under a five-year management contract to improve its performance and rehabilitate and extend the infrastructure.

The main objectives of the 5-year management contract were:

- Improving the reliability (pressure and flow rate) and quality of potable water,
- Ensuring the company’s financial sustainability,
- Improving customer service, and
- Providing access to potable water at affordable prices to low income consumers.

The reduction of non-revenue water and was an important means to achieve these objectives.

In March 2008, severe water shortages in Accra were reported, leading the Minister for Water Resources, Works and Housing to review whether AVRL was working in compliance with the management contract. However, he explained that the reason for the shortages were unforeseen power outages at two water treatment plants in Weija and Kpong. According to the Minister, the overall situation would improve notably by the end of 2008 due to several new boreholes and a more stable power supply. In March 2008 the National Coalition Against Privatisation of Water (NCAP) called for the abrogation of the management contract for alleged "lack of performance", especially related to the lack of achievement of “Service Standards” for pressure and flow as determined in Schedule 4 of the contract. The Minister responded by pointing to an upcoming mid-term review.

In early 2011, the Minister of Water Resources, Works and Housing, Alban Bagbin, criticised Aqua Vitens Rand for failing to live up to expectations. Residents complained that they did not receive water and workers protested against "the management style" of the company. The government did not renew the management contract when it expired in June 2011. The Government is evaluating options for the next steps in the reform of the water sector.

== Impact ==
The management contract achieved some of its objectives, but failed to reach others.

Improving the reliability (pressure and flow rate) and quality of potable water: This objective was not reached in terms of pressure and flow rate, but was reached in terms of quality. Water pressure had originally been a contractual target, but the target was removed in common agreement with the government, because constant power cuts beyond the control of the private operator would not allow this target to be reached. It is unclear if a target for the flow rate was defined. Increasing the continuity of supply proved to be a challenge, since water production was insufficient to meet demand and could not be increased with the investment funds available. Water quality was not systematically monitored at the beginning of the contract. Water from wells was often not chlorinated or only in a very rudimentary manner. Water produced by treatment plants was not properly treated, with some of the treatment steps simplified or simply avoided. The operator introduced a systematic monitoring for five parameters - pH, colour, turbidity, residual chlorine and e-coli - and, in the last contract year, complied with the target for all these parameters despite pollution of raw water sources.

Ensuring the company’s financial sustainability: Improvements were made. The annual revenue increased from GHC 57 million to GHC 143 million, with the operating surplus growing from GHC 9 million to GHC 36 million per annum. The increase in revenue was to a large extent due to an 80% increase in tariffs. However, without efficiency increases the increase in tariffs would have had to be even higher to achieve the same financial results. Examples of improved efficiency are a decrease in specific electricity consumption from more than 0.8 to less than 0.7 kWh per cubic meter of water and the fact that the number of staff increased by less than the increase in customers. Over the five-year period, the prices of chemicals and energy almost trebled and the average salary increased by 225%. Collection efficiency increased from an estimated level of less than 80% before the management contract to 97% in 2009. However, after a tariff increase collection efficiency declined again to 90% in 2010.

Improving customer service: A call centre was established and - according to the operator - training "improved the staff attitude towards the consumers".

Providing access to potable water at affordable prices to low income consumers: The number of connections increased from 364,000 to 438,000. However, water tariffs increased by 80%. There was no specific target concerning access of the poor to water included in the management contract. Nevertheless, with the help of the Dutch foundation "Water for Life" the operator improved the water supply for around 75,000 people in 15 peri-urban areas throughout Ghana.

Furthermore, the private operator provided 25,000 training days. Customer data were entered into a Geographical Information System (GIS), 70,000 meters were installed and meter workshops were established to repair faulty meters. Non-revenue water was only reduced marginally from an estimated 53% in 2006 to 50% in 2010, compared to a target of 26%. An accurate measurement of non-revenue water was not possible, because the installation of bulk water meters started only in 2008 and the separation of the network into district metered areas - a prerequisite to accurately locate leaks - was undertaken only during the period of the management contract. Intermittent supply also made it more difficult to locate leaks.

== See also ==
- Water supply and sanitation in Ghana
