= Water privatization in Argentina =

The privatization of water and sanitation services in Argentina between 1991 and 1999 under the government of Carlos Menem was part of one of the world's largest privatization programs. Water and sanitation concessions with the private sector were signed in 28% of the country's municipalities, covering 60% of the population.

The highest profile concession was signed in 1993 with a consortium led by the French firm Suez for the metropolitan area of Buenos Aires. After the 2001 economic crisis, under the government of Néstor Kirchner, many concessions were renegotiated. Some were even terminated, and the responsibility for service provision was reverted to public entities, as it was the case in Buenos Aires where the newly created public enterprise Agua y Saneamientos Argentinos took over the responsibility for service provision in 2006.

At the beginning of 2008, the government of the Province of Mendoza announced that it was interested in increasing its control of the provincial water utility Obras Sanitarias de Mendoza, of which it owned 20%, buying another 20% from Saur International.

== Impact of private sector participation ==
So far, there has been no comprehensive, objective assessment of the impact of private sector participation in water supply and sanitation in Argentina. However, there has been some partial evidence. For example, a 2002 study assessed the impact of privatization on child mortality based on household survey data, finding that in the 1991–1997 period child mortality fell 5 to 7 percent more in areas that privatized compared to those that remained under public or cooperative management. It also found that the effect was largest in poorest areas (24%). The authors estimate that the main reason is the massive expansion of access to water, which was concentrated in poorer areas that did not receive services before private sector participation was introduced.

=== The Buenos Aires concession ===
The largest and best-known case of private sector participation in the Argentinian water and sanitation sector was the Buenos Aires concession, signed in 1993 and revoked in 2006. Its impact remains controversial.

Critics argue that the concessionaire failed to achieve the targets set under the concession contract. When the government rescinded the concession in March 2006, it argued that Aguas Argentinas did not comply with obligations concerning expansion and quality. According to the government, the supplied water had high levels of nitrate, pressure obligations were not kept and scheduled waterworks were not executed by the concessionaire. Proponents of private participation state that a freeze in tariffs at the time of the devaluation of the peso during the Argentinian economic crisis in 2001 substantially reduced the real value of tariff revenues and thus made it difficult to achieve the original targets.

One factor which may have caused the cancellation of the concession contract was the precipitate preparation. Alcazar et al. list some features of the concession which indicate an overhasty process:

1. The regulatory agency ETOSS (Ente Tripartito de Obras de Servicios de Saneamiento, Tripartite Entity for Sanitary Services) lacked experience, since it was founded quickly as part of the concession process.
2. The available information in the concession contract about the state of the existing infrastructure was so poor, that the Argentinian government denied taking responsibility for it. This lack of information could have let the bidder to accept the contract in the expectation of future renegotiation.
3. Instead of creating a new and more transparent tariff system, the old one was adopted from OSN.

In addition, the inexperienced regulatory agency was repeatedly bypassed when decisions were taken, for example in the renegotiation of the contract in 1997. In that way, ETOSS was further weakened. The concession contract authorized Aguas Argentinas to demand dollars at the old 1:1 exchange rate after the peso devaluation. Solanes points out that without this practice, companies may seek financing in local capital markets to avoid currency fluctuations. He also argues that the needs of the poor were not addressed in the concession. No subsidies were provided for the poor and the tariff system did not encourage expansion of coverage to poor areas, since new connections were often unaffordable and new users also had to pay the costs of expanding the network.

The concessionaire did invest much more than its public predecessor and achieved substantial increases in access to water and sewerage. According to the Argentinian economist Sebastian Galiani, the public company OSN had invested only US$25 million per year between 1983 and 1993, while the private concessionaire Aguas Argentinas increased investments to around US$200 million per year between 1993 and 2000.

According to Suez, during the 13-year duration of its concession, it extended access to water to 2 million people and access to sanitation to 1 million people, despite the economic crisis. Between 2003 and 2005 alone about 100,000 inhabitants of poor neighborhoods and slums are said to have been connected through a "participatory management model" piloted by Aguas Argentinas. Aspects of the model have been adopted by the government to extend services to another 400,000 people in La Matanza in the province of Buenos Aires in the project "Water plus work" ("Aguas más trabajo").

Expansion of access to slums and so-called "barrios armados" was excluded from the concession contract, which was limited to providing access to "urbanized areas". During the first six years of the concession, Aguas Argentinas limited its approach to these areas to an analysis done together with the International Institute for Environment and Development - Latin America. Only in 1999 was a community development unit created in the company, which applied a social methodology that allowed the company to provide access to slums.

In July 2010, the International Center for the Settlement of Investment Disputes (ICSID) ruled that the Argentinian government unfairly refused to allow the private concessionaires to raise tariffs during the period after the devaluation of the Argentine peso in 2001 and that the private companies are entitled to damages. The private companies announced that they would seek US$1.2 billion in damages. In April 2015 ICSID ordered the Argentine government to pay $405m in damages to Suez.

=== An example of local private sector participation: Salta ===
The government of Salta Province initiated the reform of its water sector in 1996. At the same time, many other Argentinian provinces and municipalities brought in the private sector to improve water and sanitation services. While Salta also followed this approach, the process differed somewhat from the one in many other parts of Argentina.

First, the provincial government conducted a series of meetings with municipalities and user organizations to discuss the benefits and risks of the concession before it was bid out. This process of consultations was continued by the private concessionaire after the contract was awarded. Second, the government decided from the onset that water and sanitation services in the poor province could not be financed entirely through tariff revenues. It thus decided to finance much of the investments to be undertaken by the private concessionaire with public grants, in addition to providing consumption subsidies.

Third, the regulatory agency allowed the concessionaire to provide services at a lower standard in remote or isolated areas that were deemed unprofitable at conventional service standards. Fourth, the provincial regulatory agency granted tariff increases before and even after the 2001 economic crisis. These tariff increases were lower than it would have been necessary without subsidies or flexible service standards. And fifth, the government "ignored the traditional paradigm of only permitting companies with significant previous experience in water supply and sanitation to compete in the bidding process". That provision had favored a few large multinational water firms in other bidding processes. In Salta, however, the bid was won by the Argentinian construction, power and toll road enterprise MECON S.A., which signed a technical assistance contract with the Brazilian Paraná State public utility SANEPAR.

The private concession led to a substantial increase in access to water and sanitation from the time of concession award in 1999 to 2005. It also provided a significant decrease in service interruptions and improved customer service. Thirteen more municipalities joined the concession contract after it had been signed in order to share in its benefits, bringing the total number of municipalities served by the concessionaire to 56.

While most other private water concessions in Argentina were rescinded in the aftermath of the 2001 economic crisis, the Salta concession has been upheld. Nevertheless, the concession is not without problems. For example, in February 2008 the regulatory agency initiated penal proceedings against the concessionaire because one of its wastewater treatment plants discharging to the Arenales River was not functioning.

== See also ==
- Water supply and sanitation in Argentina
- Agua y Saneamientos Argentinos
