= Water privatization in Guinea =

Urban water supply in Guinea was privatized from 1989 until 2003 during the presidency of Lansana Conte. His government initiated water privatization for two reasons: First, the World Bank had made private sector participation in urban water supply a condition for a new credit, after the public water utility had been unable to improve service quality under a previous World Bank credit. Second, the government wanted to reduce the budgetary burden from the national public water utility, which was overstaffed and had been unable to collect bills.

In the five years after privatization, water tariffs quadrupled. The increase even exceeded the tariff increases that had originally been planned. This eased pressure on the government budget. Consumers also benefited when a bulk water pipeline and water treatment plant, both financed by the World Bank credit, were completed in 1994 resulting in improved service quality. But the tariff increase also imposed a burden on the minority of Guineans who were connected to a piped water supply system. Most of the poor in Guinea were not affected by water privatization, since they remained without access to a piped water supply system.

After the private sector contract expired in 2000 and an interim period, the sector reverted to public management. Tariffs were frozen in 1994 and inflation eroded the real value of tariffs. Service quality deteriorated and in 2003 the situation was similar to the low tariff-poor service equilibrium before privatization.

The privatization covered Conakry as well as 16 other smaller urban centers. Little is known about the effects of privatization in the smaller centers, since the literature focuses on Conakry, where the national water utility has about 80% of its customers.

== Water resources and water use in Conakry ==
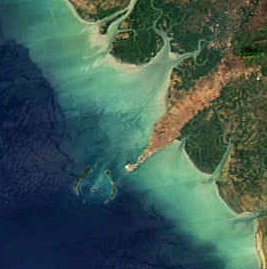
Conakry as seen from space.

Conakry is located on a peninsula with limited local water availability. Groundwater is brackish and contaminated with bacteria. Most of the piped water distributed in Conakry comes via pipeline from a large reservoir behind a dam used for hydropower generation at Grandes Chutes 60 km northeast of Conakry. The water flows by gravity to the Yessoulou treatment plant halfway between the dam and the capital. It then continues to flow through a treated water pipeline by gravity to the city where it is distributed to house connections and standpipes throughout the city.

In response to a 1999 survey, 70% of the poor in Conakry said that shallow wells and polluted, temporary streams were their main source of water for non-potable uses. 18% of the poor said these were their main sources of drinking water. Other important sources of drinking water for the poor were the resale of piped water (41%), standpipes (13%) and piped water connections in their homes (28%). Rainwater harvesting is also common for non-potable uses during the rainy season.

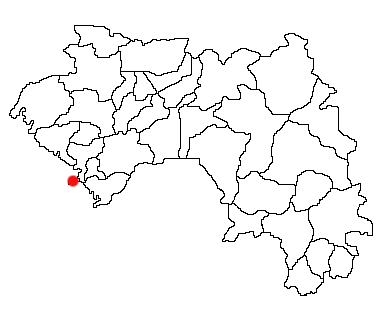
Map of Guinea showing the location of Conakry.

Standpipes. Standpipes are an effective option to supply the urban poor with clean water, in the absence of house connections to the piped network. However, in 1997 there were only 170 standpipes in Conakry, some of which were not working. The municipality of Conakry managed the standpipes.

The municipality was supposed to pay a fee to the water company for the water it received from the company. The municipality was also supposed to collect fees from standpipe users through caretakers that sold water by the bucket to residents. However, customers expected water from standpipes to be free and the caretakers in charge of the standpipes often provided it for free.

The local government, which did not receive any significant revenues from the standpipes, did not pay the water company for the water supply to the standpipes. As a result, the operator cut off water supply to standpipes. Neither the municipality nor the operator was interested in seeing more standpipes being built under this dysfunctional arrangement. The number of standpipes thus remained limited, although they could potentially have provided a large number of poor with clean water at lower costs than house connections.

== Evolution of privatization ==
=== Prior to privatization ===
During colonial time, piped drinking water in urban areas of Guinea was provided by a French private company, the Compagnie Africaine de Service Public. After independence the company was nationalized in 1961 as part of the policy of African socialism promoted by Sekou Toure. At the time the World Bank supported the public water utility, but results were disappointing.

In the mid-1980s only 10 of the 33 urban centers had piped water supply. Water was unsafe to drink and service was intermittent. In 1985 the first studies were conducted in preparation of a possible privatization. The government, confronted with coup attempts and not wanting to stir up opposition, waited four years before taking a decision. The World Bank held back a new loan until a decision was taken.

=== Choice of the lease model ===
The government looked at various options for private sector participation in urban water supply, including a long-term concession (up to 30 years), a mid-term lease (10 years) and a short-term management contract (about 5 years). It chose a lease (affermage) in part because a lease contract in neighboring Ivory Coast was widely considered in West Africa as being a success.

Like in Ivory Coast, the reforms in Guinea included a single lease contract for water supply in all urban centers of the country. As for all lease contracts, ownership of assets remained with the state. Like in Ivory Coast, the government took a minority stake in the private company that held the lease contract. The 51% majority stake was to be held by a private consortium to be selected via an international competitive bid.

While in Ivory Coast the state owned the infrastructure directly, in Guinea the state created a public holding company called SONEG for that purpose. SONEG owned all assets and was in charge of investment planning. In addition, SONEG operated the transmission pipeline and water treatment plant that provided bulk water to the capital Conakry, because they were considered strategic assets. Only the distribution network and the billing of customers were to be managed by the private company.

Under this new institutional arrangement, investments continued to be mostly financed by external donors. Only a fraction of total investments were financed by the private operator. Customers paid their bills to the private operator, who in turn paid a lease fee (redevance) to the asset holding company. The asset holding company in turn was in charge of debt service, asset renewal and extension. Government subsidies were to be phased out during the period of the lease contract. This was to be achieved through a combination of tariff increases and improved efficiency.

The competitive bid for the lease contract was won by a consortium consisting of two French companies, SAUR and Vivendi (today Veolia Environnement). The winning consortium was selected based on the lowest bid in terms of remuneration per unit of water. SAUR and Vivendi bid lowest, a full 30% lower than the consultants’ estimate. However, their initial low price proved to be of little benefit for customers since tariffs increased sharply during the first years of the lease.

=== Implementation ===
During the first five years of the contract the government regularly approved requests for tariff increases from the private company without much questions asked. There was no independent regulatory agency that could give a professional opinion about whether a request for tariff increases was justified or not. There was also no financial model that could have served as a tool to help analyze of requests to increase tariffs. According to the World Bank the regulatory capacity of the asset holding company remained weak throughout the contract.

Most importantly, the asset holding company was not independent, since it received itself a significant share of tariff revenues. Both the public and the private company had strong incentives to increase tariffs, since they both received a share of the water sales. After tariffs had quadrupled in five years, the government finally imposed a tariff freeze in 1994. Afterewards, it did not grant any more tariff increases.

The relationship between the public asset holding company SONEG and the private operating company SEEG was not smooth. The companies blamed each other for lack of progress. For example, when the company was told at one time that it could not disconnect non-paying customers, it reduced its lease payments to the government accordingly, although this had not been foreseen in the lease contract. According to a World Bank report, the private contractor was also "frustrated" by the slow pace of investments by SONEG. The private company thus arranged for "bilateral financing" so that it could build infrastructure under contracts awarded to itself on a sole source basis.

The private company received as much raw water from the asset holding company as it needed for free. While higher efficiency was an objective of the privatization, the private operator had no incentives to improve operating efficiency by reducing water losses because of the free availability of water.

During the last years of the contract governance in Guinea deteriorated and donors were increasingly frustrated with the government and reluctant to commit new funds to an increasingly authoritarian government that was accused of corruption and human rights violations. Under these circumstances it was doubtful if the lease contract would be renewed. As a result, the private company had few incentives to make efforts to improve or even maintain service quality during the last years of the contract.

=== Return to public management ===
When the term of the 10-year lease contract came to a close the government and the private company negotiated about a possible new lease contract. But the negotiations failed and in December 2000 the private operator withdrew. According to the Minister of Water in charge at the time, the government wanted to go beyond a lease and had asked the private operator to take on more investment obligations while limiting tariff increases. Disagreements about investments and tariff levels led the negotiations to fail. The government promised to the World Bank that it would launch a bid for a new private sector contract, but it failed to do so. After an interim period with an interim management contract, the sector reverted to public management in 2003.

== Impact of privatization ==
=== Tariff increase ===
Tariffs increased substantially, starting with an increase right at the beginning of the contract from 60 to 150 Guinean franc (GF)/m3 ($0.12/m3 to $0.25/m3). By 1994 the tariff had increased to 880 GF/m3 ($0.90/m3), having increased "far more quickly than originally planned", according to the World Bank. The increased revenues were used to reduce government subsidies and to repay debt. In 1994 tariffs were frozen and due to inflation the real value of the tariff had declined to $0.63/m3 by 1999. Due to high levels of inflation real water tariffs declined to $0.21/m3 in 2005, which was below their level at the beginning of the lease contract.

=== Improvements in terms of access, service quality and public revenues ===
- The number of connections doubled from 12,000 in 1988 to 23,000 in 1996. It is not clear if inactive connections of customers who were cut off for non-payment are included in these figures. It was estimated that in 1994 nearly 12,000 connections were inactive because of non-payment.
- Water quality improved significantly after the new water treatment plant was put into service. The Organization for Consumer Protection rated water as excellent and the local Coca-Cola bottling plant started using water supplied from the network. According to the World Bank a third of the customers received disinfected water 24hours a day every day of the week before the additional transmission pipeline and the expanded treatment plant became operational in 1994. Afterwards all customers were said to receive disinfected water continuously.
- Metering of residential customers increased from 5% to 95%
- Many customers were not billed at all before the lease and were billed for the first time when the lease contract started
- Revenues tripled in USD terms to more than US$20M.

=== Remaining challenges ===
- Non-revenue water stagnated at an estimated 45-50%. Physical losses actually increased when continuous supply was introduced and water pressure increased.
- Collection efficiency decreased as tariffs went up, then increased when water quality was improved, decreased again and remained below its original level of 80%.
- Initially, the number of staff was almost halved. Then the number of staff was kept the same while the number of connections doubled. Still, at the end of the concession, the utility was overstaffed with 10 employees per 1,000 connections, more than twice the benchmark for good practice.

=== Impact on the electricity sector and on water privatization in Senegal ===
The government of Guinea decided to reform the electricity sector along the same lines as the water sector a few years after the water lease contract was signed. The electricity lease contract also was not renewed after it ended.

The Senegalese government sent a fact-finding mission to Guinea in 1994 to assess the results of the reform. Subsequently, it embarked on a national 10-year lease contract for water supply in Senegal. However, it learned from the mistakes in Guinea. For example, it made tariff increases conditional on a well-justified proposal based on a financial model showing that costs had increased. It also included incentives for the reduction of non-revenue water in the contract.
