= Alegra Wolter =

Indonesian doctor and transgender rights activist (born 1994)

Alegra Wolter (born 19 August 1994) is an Indonesian doctor and transgender rights activist. Wolter is thought to be the first openly transgender physician in Indonesia.

== Personal life ==
She was born on 19 August 1994. Raised as male, she felt her gender identity was female from a young age, which made her realize that she had gender dysphoria. Because of her gender identity, she experienced bullying and trauma during her youth. This condition worsened when her parents brought her to a hospital, where she was administered testosterone to make her more masculine, which made her become depressed. Then, she attended Canisius College, a private Catholic secondary school for boys located in Menteng, Central Jakarta. Attending all-boys school further worsened her depression. She became interested in being a doctor after seeing a career presentation by an alum of the school.

While attending Atma Jaya Catholic University of Indonesia, she came out as transgender. She has said this decision was essential for her mental well-being because at that time, she considered committing suicide. When she graduated from the university in 2018, she wore a kebaya, which is traditional women's clothing, to the ceremony, marking her first time appearing as a woman in public.

== Career and activism ==
She works as a partnership manager in Docquity Indonesia, a health startup, and part time as a doctor for Angsa Merah, a clinic of reproductive and sexual health in Jakarta. She advocates against the discrimination faced by transgender and other gender minority communities within Indonesia's healthcare system. She points to systemic issues in administrative registration, where trans women are called by their birth names from their Indonesian identity cards, which can cause significant anxiety and discourage them from seeking care. She also notes that many transgender people lack identity cards, which bars them from accessing BPJS Kesehatan, Indonesia's healthcare insurance, and also often experiencing misgendered in facilities, such as being placed in male wards.
