= Puskesmas =

Indonesian health clinic

The Puskesmas logo, introduced in 2014.

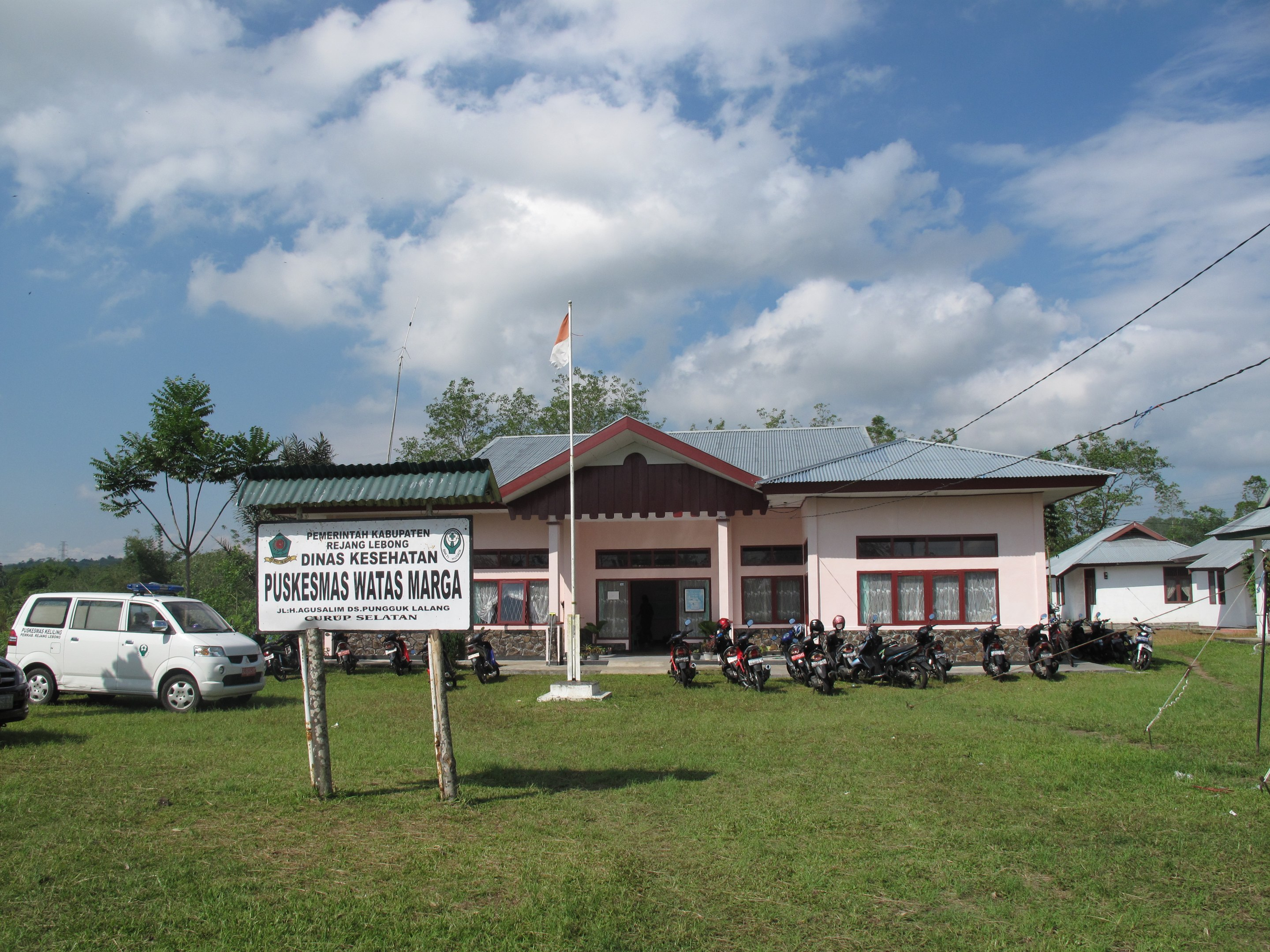
Puskesmas Watas Warga Curup Selatan, Rejang Lebong, Bengkulu.

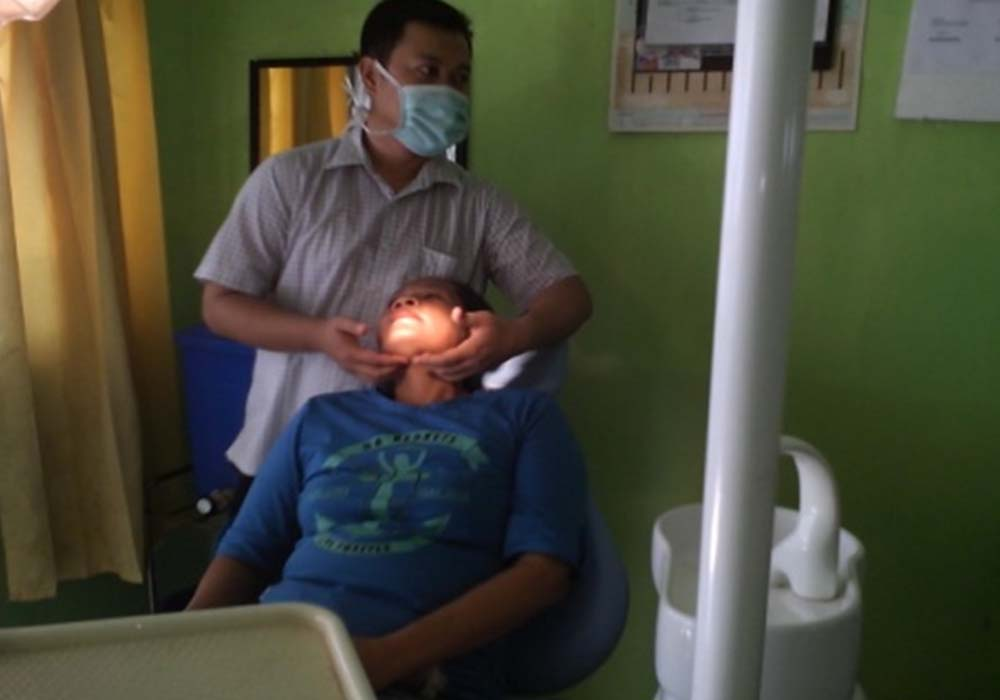
Dentistry service in Puskesmas Susunan Baru, Bandar Lampung, Lampung

The Pusat Kesehatan Masyarakat (lit. 'Community Health Center'), abbreviated as Puskesmas, are government-mandated community health clinics located across Indonesia. They are overseen by the Indonesian Ministry of Health and provide healthcare for the population on sub-district level. The concept was designed by Johannes Leimena, the third Indonesian Minister of Health, and was realized by G. A. Siwabessy in New Order era. Community and preventive health programs formed another component of Indonesia's health system. There are 10,180 Puskesmas facilities around the country according to the Ministry of Health report in 2023; all are regarded as "first-level health facilities" by the national healthcare provider BPJS Kesehatan.

Community health services in Indonesia were organized in a three-tier system with Puskesmas at the top. Usually staffed by a physician, these centres provided maternal and child health care, general outpatient curative and preventive health care services, pre- and postnatal care, immunization, and communicable disease control programs. Specialised clinic services were periodically available at some of the larger clinics.

There are two kinds of Puskesmas, those with beds and those without one. The Puskesmas without beds generally acts as a public outpatient treatment facility, is rarely open after mid-day, and is definitely not likely to be either open or prepared to deal with an obstetric emergency outside of clinic hours. This centre is usually staffed by a Bidan (Midwife) and a general practitioner who provide preventive and curative services related to 18 different health programmes including Antenatal care and family planning program. These Puskesmas however have been characterised as under-burdened and problematic as these health centre tend to bypass serious patient to higher level of health services. Should a critically ill patient appear at this type of facility, the staff are more likely to simply send the patient on to the next level of care than to attempt to administer first aid or try to prepare the patient for transfer.

The Puskesmas with beds are mostly located in more remote areas and ideally should be staffed and equipped to provide Basic Emergency Obstetric Care/Pelayanan Obstetri Neonatus Emergensi Dasar (BEOC/PONED) twenty-four hours per day. A midwife and a GP, who are not always properly trained for BEOC/PONED, staff these centres. Those who have been trained are reluctant to attempt procedures such as manual removal of placenta when a case requiring this procedure presents to them very rarely. UNICEF has funded BEOC/PONED/LSS training of some Puskesmas staff in three provinces early in the life of the project. They also funded education for Puskesmas midwives on the administration of the MCH (Maternal and Child Health Specialist) program and on how to supervise midwives in various villages.

== See also ==
- Health in Indonesia
- Healthcare in Indonesia
