= Disability in Indonesia =

Estimates for the prevalence of disability in Indonesia vary widely based on criteria. The 2010 Indonesian census reports that only 4.29% of Indonesians have disabilities, with a rate of 3.94% among men and 4.64% among women. Data from the 2007 Riskesdas household survey, by contrast, based on a definition of having a lot of difficulty in at least one functional domain, gives a rate of disability of 11.05%, with 9.40% for males and 12.57% for females. Both sets of data show rates of disability rising significantly with age.

Indonesia is a party to the United Nations Convention on the Rights of Persons with Disabilities, having signed the treaty on 30 March 2007 and ratified it on 30 November 2011.

== See also ==
- Health in Indonesia
- Rawinala
