= Obesity in Indonesia =

Share of adults that are obese, 1975 to 2016

According to the World Health Organization (2015), the "worldwide population of overweight and obese adults increased between 1980 and 2013 from 30 percent to 38 percent in women, and 29 percent to 37 percent in men". The prevalence of obesity continues to rise in all age groups in Indonesia.

== Definition and characteristics of obesity ==
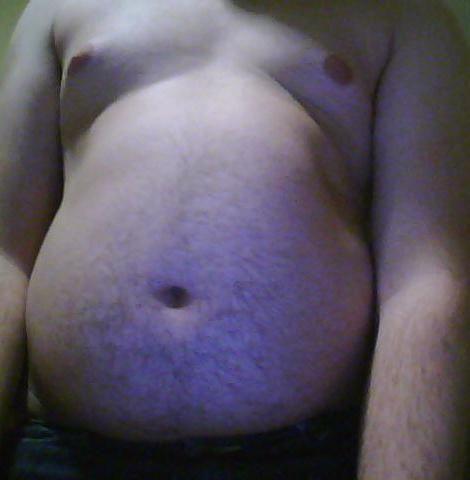
Obese individual with a BMI of >30

The generally accepted definition and classification of obesity is attributed by the World Health Organization where it is generally classified by a person's weight measured by the Body Mass Index (BMI) scale. A figure is deduced by dividing an individual's weight in kilograms by their height in meters, squared. An adult individual with a BMI of 25 or higher is considered overweight; 30 or higher is considered obese.

Category	BMI
Underweight	< 18.5
Normal	18.5–24.9
Overweight (Pre-obese)	25.0–29.9
Obese (Class I)	30.0–34.9
Obese (Class II)	35.0–39.9
Obese (Class III)	≥ 40

== Overview ==
Obesity is a major risk factor for non-communicable diseases. In Indonesia, obesity also contributes to "double burden of disease" because the incidence of infection which causes morbidity and mortality, is also increasing.

In an article published by Elsevier, deducing the data from 1993 until 2007 of the Indonesia Family and Life Survey of the Rand Corporation, it illustrates that it was found evident of main trends and determinants of obesity to be correlated with higher standards of living. A published paper by the German Development Economics Conference held in Berlin in 2011, it was stated that Indonesia was facing rapid economic growth and urbanization that included the "transformation of traditional food systems towards modern supply chains".

== Prevalence of obesity in the Indonesian population ==
=== Prevalence in children and adolescents ===
From 2007 until 2013, several national studies on the Indonesian population named the National Baseline Health Research were conducted by the Ministry of Health of the Republic of Indonesia. It was found that the prevalence rates of obesity amongst school-aged children have increased from 7.95% to 8.80% during the period.

In a published article by Elsevier, the World Health Organization Regional Office for South East Asia Region stated that "undernutrition and overweight coexist within the population". The study shows that "Indonesia currently has the highest prevalence rate of overweight/obesity in under five children".

The World Health Organization carried out national studies ranging from 1993 until 2011. The results showed that in 1993, the prevalence of obesity for children aged between 2 and 4.9 was 10.3%. The same study was conducted in 1997, 2000 and 2007 which showed that the prevalence of obesity for children of that said age range has increased to 10.6%, 11.7% and 16.5% respectively. In 2001, the prevalence of obesity for boys and girls aged 8 until 10 years old was 17.8% and 15.3% respectively. Another analysis using data from 1993 by the Indonesian Family Life Survey (IFLS) found that "the children (boys aged 6.0 to 8.9 years and girls aged 6.0 to 7.9 years) were divided into three groups: non-poor urban, rural and poor urban group." The results show that the non-poor urban group had a significantly higher prevalence than the rural and poor urban group with 4.9%, 1.0% and 0.7% respectively.

In 2002, the Centers for Disease Control and Prevention conducted a regional study on adolescents aged 12 to 15 and found that the prevalence of obesity was 8%. In 2007, the same study was conducted for adolescents aged 16 to 18 and the results were that the prevalence for obesity was 2.7% where the prevalence for boys and girls were 2.2% and 3.2% respectively. In 2010, a larger study was conducted by the World Health Organization on a larger age group for adolescents aged from 10 to 19. The results show that the prevalence of obesity was 9.8% where the prevalence for boys and girls were 8.7% and 10.8%. Based on the statistics, girls had a higher statistic for prevalence of obesity for the adolescents age group for the regional studies.

In 2022, Indonesian government is developing strategies to prevent obesity in children to lower the risk of non-communicable diseases such as diabetes.

=== Prevalence in adults ===
In 2014, there were four studies conducted using data from the IFLS in years 1993, 2000 and 2007. The first study showed that the prevalence of obesity in adults was increasing over the years for both men and women. Women also proved to have higher obesity rates compared to men. The second study was a data analysis using the 1993 data which showed that the prevalence of obesity amongst Indonesian adults was 14.6% . The data from 1993 and 2007 was used for the third study which found that the prevalence of overweight/obese women, aged 19-49, nearly doubled during the 14-year period. The fourth study using the 2007 data found that the prevalence amongst Indonesian adults was higher for women compared to men. In 2005, a regional study conducted by the Global Health Action found that the prevalence of obesity/overweight for adults in Indonesia, aged 25 to 64, was significantly higher for women than men with rates of 23.9% and 9.5% respectively.

In 2013, the Basic Healthy Survey conducted by the Ministry of Health showed that the prevalence of obesity in adult women has substantially increased from 14.8% to 32.9%.

== Demographics and socioeconomic factors ==
In Indonesia, socio-economic status and lifestyle are risk factors in being diagnosed with obesity.

=== Food consumption and nutritional variables ===
In Indonesia, the economy continues to develop its food chain to undergo rapid changes in transforming the traditional food systems to modern supply chains including the production of fast food, processed food and conveniently packaged high-fat content and energy dense food.

In 2011, the German Development Economics Conference paper stated that as living standards rise and lifestyle change occur, the demands for food products increases and dietary composition changes. Higher overall consumption of processed food and dairy products led to higher rates of obesity within the population. In a dietary study by Rachmi et al. (2017), the result was that the prevalence of obesity among children and adolescents who frequently ate fried and oily food more than 4 times a week is higher than their counterparts at 7.2% and 4.7% respectively. In a study in 2007 and 2009, conducted in DKI Jakarta and Banda Aceh Municipality, it was evident that higher consumption of fried food contributed to the prevalence of obesity.

=== Physical activities variables ===
In 2011, the German Development Economics Conference paper explicitly mentioned that the apart from the change of food consumption pattern, physical activities during both work and leisure time is strongly related to the increasing prevalence of obesity in the Indonesian population. A study conducted by Elsevier, it was found that for children, who played outdoors for less than an hour compared to who played for more than an hour, were likely to be overweight at prevalence rates of 26.2% and 15.5% respectively. Additionally, a higher incidence of obesity was displayed for children who played outdoors for less than two hours on the weekend compared to those who played for more than 2 hours at 23.4% and 17.4%. Apart from outdoor activities, indoor activities were found to be evidently contributing to the epidemic. Children who played computer games or tablet for longer than an hour compared to those who spend less than an hour, were more likely show a higher incidence of obesity at 25.0% and 18.8% respectively.

A study by Aizawa and Helble (2017) found that due to increased economic development and urbanization, the labor-intensive jobs are being replaced with more automated methods of work thus requiring lesser physical activity. The labor-intensive work is generally categorized as hard manual work, which is commonly a job title that the poorer population owns. In this sense, the physical activity involved in the automated and less labor-intensive job are far less compared to the jobs that require harder physical-intense work that is common among the poor population, which implies that the population working automated methods of work have a higher incidence of obesity and being overweight.

=== Economic factors ===
In terms of economic factors, education and the level of income is a main factor in regards to the prevalence of obesity among the population of Indonesia. An article published by Elsevier found that the education attainment for both parents and children have a significant impact on the prevalence of obesity of the population. The study found that there are more children whose mother have lower educational attainment are underweight compared to the children whose mother who are well educated, at 20.8% and 12.6% respectively. Contrasting this, according to the study, mothers of children who are highly educated display a higher prevalence of obesity among their children at 22.9%. Additionally, children in middle and high-income families compared to children in low-income families are found to be more overweight/obese, with prevalence rates of 28.8% and 17.1% respectively.

In the Basic Health Survey in 2007 and 2010, it was revealed that "higher economic status was associated with overweight/obesity, both in children and adults".

=== Location (Rural and Non-rural) ===
A study in 2011 found that female adolescents living in non-rural urban areas had a 1.26 fold higher chance of being obese and overweight, whereas the prevalence of obesity in children aged 12 and under in urban areas was double that of children in rural areas with 10.7% and 5.1% respectively. In study conducted in 2013 and 2014 revealed that the prevalence of obesity among adults aged 19 to 55, are substantially higher in those living in non-rural urban areas. According to the World Health Organization (2000), women aged 19 to 55 living in urban areas also have higher prevalence rate compared to their counterpart at 32.4% and 25.9% respectively.

According to the German Development Economics Conference paper, in 1998, it is stated that infrastructure in the rural areas of Indonesia had an impact on food consumption thus obesity rates. Infrastructure in rural parts are worse than in urban areas, therefore walking is overly common. In addition to walking, smoking is a common habit of Indonesian people. Smoking leads to reduced appetite and influence the metabolism rate to increase.

=== Lifestyle ===
According to a local article in 2007, the correlation between household chores and risk of being overweight/obese is found to be inversely related. Meaning regularly doing chores was associated with smaller risk of obesity. The International Physical Activity Questionnaire stated that adolescents aged 16 to 18 who were inactive had a 2.58 fold greater risk to being obese compared to their active "counterparts".

In 2012 and 2013, two studies revealed that adults working with lighter levels of physical activity were found to be at greater risk of being obese. Furthermore, a television was used as a proxy to how Indonesian people spend their leisure time. It was found that owning a television is positively correlated with being obese and having a high BMI. Owning a television increases the tendency to adopt a more sedentary lifestyle which may reduce time for physical activity.

== Implication of obesity in Indonesia ==
In 2018, the Asian Pacific Journal of Cancer Prevention published a research article and was found that obesity was "one of the risk factor for non-communicable diseases" which escalates mortality rate. The estimated number of cases that attributed to obesity in 2015 was just below 2 million and the total number of deaths totaled around 102,000. Furthermore, the country's total indirect costs due to obesity amounted to approximately $28.3 billion or equivalent to 368.25 trillion rupiah.

Indonesia is one of the top 10 countries with the "highest prevalence" of cancer mortality due to obesity. The types of cancer that obesity has attributed to include "esophagus cancer, colon cancer, liver cancer, gallbladder cancer, pancreatic cancer, and renal cancer".

== See also ==
- Health in Indonesia
- Epidemiology of obesity
- Obesity-associated morbidity
