= Cigarette excise in Indonesia =

Type of tax in Indonesia

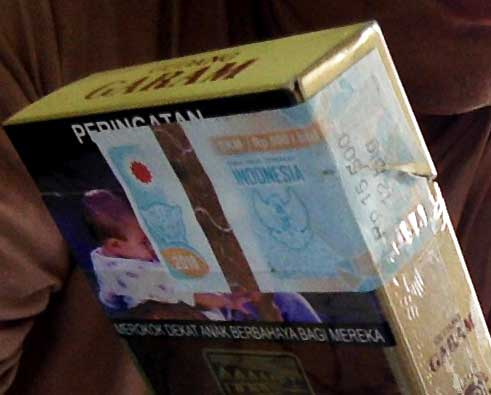
Excise tape on cigarette

Cigarette excise tax in Indonesia is a kind of tax that is functioned to control the retail prices of cigarettes done the Indonesian government on cigarettes and other tobacco products such as cigarettes, cigars, and leaf cigarettes.

This provision applies with the existence of Act Number 11 of 1995 (Undang-Undang Nomor 11 Tahun 1995) concerning Excise, with some revisions referring to Act Number 39 of 2007 (Undang-Undang Nomor 39 Tahun 2007). This rule was then complemented by Act Number 28 of 2009 (Undang-Undang Nomor 28 Tahun 2009) concerning Regional Taxes and Regional Levies. Taxation of tobacco with cigarette excise is well distinguished.

== History and legend ==
In Indonesia oral tradition, the imposition of taxes and excise on cigarettes was first attributed to the legend Rara Mendut. Rara Mendut rejected Tumenggung Wiraguna's proposal after becoming a tribute to the success of Mataram in quelling the Pati Rebellion in 1627. Angered by her rejection, Tumenggung Wiraguna levied 3 Real a day as a levy. This request was fulfilled by Rara Mendut by selling cigarettes. His cigarettes were a sellout because Rara Mendut's beauty was admired by the man in the kingdom, and according to gossip, he taped the rolled cigarette with his own saliva.

=== Establishment of customs and excise practice ===
Officially and in written history, customs and excise have been established in Indonesia since the Dutch colonial era, based on Dutch Indies Law Tabsacccijns Ordonnantie, Stbl. 1932 Number 517, which was then followed up as the founding of De Dienst der Invoer en Uitvoerrechten en Accijnzen (I. U & A). This organization continued during the Japanese occupation, but only levied excise, and was restructured during the Indonesian administration. Cigarettes and tobacco remain the target of excise duties today.

== Purpose of imposing excise ==
The danger of cigarette consumption for health has been proven by many studies in the world. Tobacco consumption control has become a holistic approach that requires the contribution of various parties. One of the cigarette control mechanisms that can be enforced by the government is to push the selling price of cigarettes through excise. The imposition of excise to increase the price of cigarettes at an extremely low price has succeeded in reducing cigarette consumption and reducing the prevalence of cigarette related diseases in various countries, such as South Korea, France and the Philippines.

== Protection of juveniles and teenagers ==
Of all the various cigarette consumers, the most critical influence about the low price of cigarettes is juveniles and adolescents. With pennies in hand, they can obtain cigarettes easily, which is only Rp. 1,000 (around $0.07) at most case. Thi has been a reason why cigarette excise needs to be increased, so that it becomes unaffordable for them. At present, Indonesia ranks the top of the country with the largest proportion of early smokers in the Asia Pacific. Based on data released by Global Youth Tobacco Survey in 2014, one of five children aged 13–15 years in Indonesia has smoked. If this condition develops consistently, Indonesia will bear the burden of high healthcare expense when they grow up and start suffering from degenerative diseases earlier due to smoking habits at an early age.

=== Battling the low priced cigarette ===
The smoking prevalence in Indonesia is the highest in the world for adult male smokers, teen smokers, and juvenile smokers. One of the main causes is the outrageously low price of cigarettes in Indonesia. The average price of cigarettes in Indonesia is very low compared to prices in Asian countries such as Singapore, Malaysia, Thailand and even India is the main factor why the number is still high. This is exacerbated by the habit of street vendors selling single cigarette, making it easier for poor people or children to buy them at very cheap prices. Therefore, a policy is needed to make the price of cigarettes soar.

== Determination of excise ==
=== Progression of cigarette excise ===
From year to year, state revenues from Cigarette Excise continue to increase. In 2007, for example, it was recorded Rp 43.53 trillion. In 2014, this increased to Rp. 112.54 trillion. In 2016, the country received 137.94 trillion. Indonesia initially adopted the 'ad valorem' excise system, or a percentage of the sale value, but since 2009 it has been changed to a specific tariff based on the Keputusan Menteri Keuangan. The amount of the excise tariff is determined based on the type of cigarette and the size of the cigarette factory. Even though the value is increased every year, the increment of cigarette excise rates is limited to the limit of 57% based on Act No. 39 of 2007. This determination strongly considers matters such as consumption control, prevention of fake or illegal excise, impacts on worker employment and farmers, and state revenues.

Per 2018, the cigarette excise tariff averages up 10.04 percent from the previous year.

Cigarette excise year on year
Tahun	2015	2016	2017	2018
SKM Golongan I	415	480	530	590
SKM Golongan IIA	305	340	365	385
SKM Golongan IIB	265	300	335	370
SPM Golongan I	425	495	555	625
SPM Golongan IIA	270	305	330	370
SPM Golongan IIB	220	255	290	355
SKT/SPT Golongan IA	290	320	345	365
SKT/SPT Golongan IB	220	245	265	290
SKT/SPT Golongan IIA	140	155	165	180
SKT/SPT Golongan IIB	145	140	155	180
SKT/SPT Golongan IIIA	85	90	100	100
SKT/SPT Golongan IIIB	80	80	80	100

=== Simplification of excise categorisation ===
Based on Peraturan Menteri Keuangan No. 146 Year 2017, the government is willing to simplify the imposition of excise. Based on the specified roadmap, the number of cigarette excise layers will be cut step by step from 12 in 2017, to ten layers in 2018, eight layers by 2019, six layers by 2020, and five layers by 2021. This policy is a part of government's strategy in reducing cigarette consumption.

=== Criticism ===
The Simplification of the imposition of cigarette excise invites criticism and input that the policy must be carried out consistently, any opposition that occurs, because if changed again can invite wonder and questions from the public. On the other hand, this simplification provokes disagreement from small and medium scale cigarette companies as it is considered to make the excise to be paid even greater.

== State revenue from cigarette excise and taxes ==
The excise, and also taxes, contributes high revenue to the country. The proportion to total state revenues was 6.31 percent in 2007. This portion increased to 7.10 percent in 2012 with total excise revenues of Rp. 95.03 trillion. In 2015, the proportion was 9.59 percent of the total state revenue of Rp144.64 trillion. However, it should be understood that in addition to providing income, the government's burden in healthcare from cigarettes and tobacco consumption is higher than the amount of tobacco excise contributions to state revenues. Economic losses due to tobacco, assessed by the Ministry of Health, showing an increasing trend. In 2010, this economic loss amounted to Rp245.41 trillion or 4 times state revenue from tobacco excise. He increased to IDR 378.75 trillion in 2013 or 3 times from state revenue.

=== Revenue sharing ===
State revenue from excise on tobacco products made in Indonesia is distributed to tobacco-producing excise provinces, by 2% (two percent), which are used to fund the improvement of quality of raw materials processing, industrial development, social environment development, socialization of provisions, and / or eradication goods subject to illegal excise, in accordance with Article 66A of the Act No. 39 of 2007. Every year the Ministry of Finance issues details on Tobacco Excise Profit Sharing Funds through the Peraturan Menteri Keuangan.

== Local cigarette tax ==
Regional cigarette tax is totally different from cigarette excise. In addition to excise tax, cigarettes are also subject to additional regional cigarette tax of 10% of the excise tariff, in accordance with Article 29 of the Act No. 28 of 2009 concerning Regional Taxes and Regional Retribution. Cigarette tax is carried out together with the excise. Regional cigarette tax receipts are distributed to all regional governments proportional to the population in each region. Cigarette tax revenue, both provincial and district / city, must be allocated at least 50 percent to fund public health services and law enforcement by authorized officials, in accordance with Article 31 of the act.

=== Benefits to healthcare financing ===
Based on Peraturan Presiden No. 82 Tahun 2018, all regions may and must use cigarette tax revenues to cover the budget deficit of the social security agency (BPJS), particularly BPJS Kesehatan. The contribution of cigarette tax and excise as intended, according to this Perpres, is 75% of the 50% realization of cigarette tax receipts. The contribution is immediately deducted to be transferred into the BPJS Healthcare account.

This policy brings praise from Director of the Center for Indonesia Taxation Analysis (CITA) Yustinus Prastowo. According to him, the Peraturan President signed by President Joko Widodo is a perfect solution in addition to the low level of regional budget discipline, especially in planning and measuring the outcome. General Chair of the Association of Indonesian Cigarette Manufacturers (GAPPRI) Ismanu Soemiran also appreciates this step. He stated that the tobacco industry has a concern for the fate of the Indonesian people, because cigarettes in Indonesia cannot be equated with the cigarette industry abroad, it is a collaboration between agriculture smallholders, so this policy is a solution to healthcare while on the other hand maintaining the sustainability of the tobacco industry.

This decision is also appreciated as being able to help BPJS by Planning and Policy Specialist, Center for Indonesia's Strategic Development Initiatives (CISDI) Yurdhina Meilissa. In addition to patching BPJS funds, it is also recommended to be allocated specifically for smoking cessation services especially for consumers from poor families and children. The BPJS Health report does show the total disease burden borne by national healthcare insurance, 21 percent of which are diseases caused by consumption of cigarettes such as ischemic, cerebrovascular heart disease, tuberculosis, diabetes and chronic respiratory diseases.

The increase of excise tariff every year always invites debate. In terms of control, the increase in excise is considered important for making cigarettes unreachable, although so far the increase that has occurred has not been successful in making cigarettes more expensive and unaffordable for vulnerable groups such as children and adolescents. On the other hand, the increase in cigarette excise worries the industry and the people who depend on the cigarette production chain, such as farmers, laborers, and traders. In addition, the government is deemed necessary to develop non-price policies such as enforcement of Non-Smoking Zone (KTR) regulations. (KTR).

However, there is no empirical evidence to prove that there is a connection between the increase in excise tax and a decrease in the welfare of farmers.

== See also ==
- Tobacco control
- Tobacco taxation
