= Water privatisation in Jakarta =

Water privatisation in Jakarta (Indonesian: swastanisasi air bersih Jakarta) began when the British water company Thames Water entered into an agreement with the son of then-President Suharto in 1993 to obtain a water concession. Under the influence of the French water company Suez, however, the government decided to split the city's service area between the two companies. The government awarded Thames Water and Suez each a concession for one half of the city without competitive bidding. The contracts foresaw water charge increases that would allow the companies to earn a comfortable 22 percent rate of return. However, only two months after the contracts were signed, the Indonesian rupiah massively lost in value due to the East Asian financial crisis, and President Suharto was toppled. The concessions survived, but the government imposed a tariff freeze and the contracts had to be renegotiated to reduce their targets. In 2006 Suez sold half and Thames Water all its shares to Indonesian investors.

The main targets of the concession were to increase service coverage from an initial 46 percent and to reduce water losses from 61 percent. The original target of the concessions was to reach 75 percent service coverage in 2008 and 100 percent at the end of the concession. They also aimed to reduce water losses to 25 percent by 2008 and 20 percent by the end of the concession. These targets were substantially loosened during the renegotiations: The new 2008 targets were 68 percent for service coverage and 42 percent for water losses. In 2008 service coverage reached only 64 percent and water losses were reduced to only 50 percent. During the same period, water tariffs increased threefold. This increase was partly due to increases in the cost of electricity and bulk water purchases which are passed through by the private companies to the customers.

On 24 March 2015 the Central Jakarta District Court ruled the privatisation of Jakarta's water was illegal and ordered the return of the water system to public control. The court noted that the private operators were "negligent in fulfilling the human right to water for Jakarta's residents." The private operators won an appeal in the Jakarta High Court. In October 2017, the Indonesian Supreme Court overturned the appeal and confirmed the District Court Ruling that the privatization of Jakarta's water was an illegal act.

Water privatisation ended on 31 January 2023, and the next day the Jakarta provincial government took over water management.

Service areas of the two private companies: Palyja serves Central, West and South Jakarta (Areas 1, 2 and 3), while Thames Water - later Aetra - serves East and North Jakarta (Areas 4 and 5).

== Background ==
To understand the context of water privatisation in Jakarta, it is useful to know the water use pattern of residents, in particular of the poor, the particular financial mechanism of the concessions in Jakarta, the various types of water resources on which the city relies, and about other water-related challenges that are not directly related to privatisation such as floods, groundwater overexploitation and land subsidence.

=== Water and the poor ===
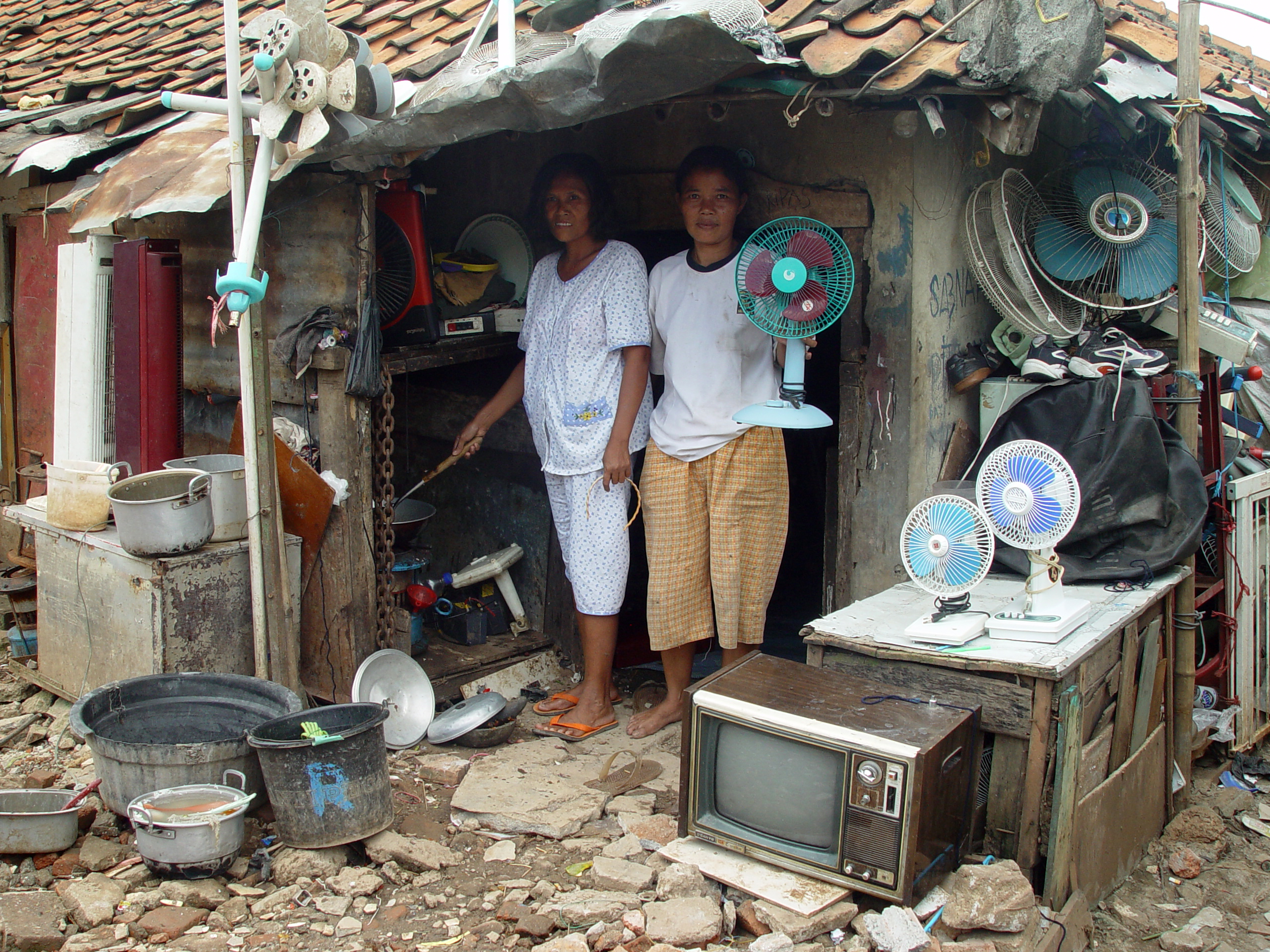
Slum residents in Jakarta.

According to a household survey concerning water use that was carried out in 2005 among 110 poor households in various neighbourhoods, poor households typically rely on a variety of water sources, including foremost network water, vended water and groundwater. Network water and groundwater are usually bought from other households that have a connection or a well, or from public hydrants that are operated by private vendors. Use of different water sources varies over time depending on changes in quality, availability and pressure. Some households also collect rainwater. According to the survey, vendor water was 10 to 32 times more expensive than piped water and 43 percent of surveyed households spent more than 5 percent of their income for water.

The poor indicated they were not so much concerned about the tariff charged by the private water companies, since it was much lower than the prices they had to pay to private vendors. They were much more concerned about the high connection fees to the network that were unaffordable for most of them. While wealthier residents use suction pumps and storage tanks to improve supply, poorer residents suffer more from low pressure and intermittent supply. Water vendors are not effectively regulated in terms of service quality and prices charged. Obtaining water from private wells or hydrants involves queuing of up to two hours and costs of 15,000 Rupiahs (US$1.66) per month and family. Bottled water was also frequently bought at a cost of up to 85,000 Rupiahs (US$9.44) per month and family. Water from wells is often polluted with bacteria and salty, with salt levels increasing in the Northern parts of the city closer to the coast. Groundwater in some areas has high iron content and needs to be filtered. According to the Jakarta Environmental Management Body 90 percent of groundwater was contaminated by metal, nitrate and e-coli in 2011. Boiling of water is frequent. Water from the public network, including at public hydrants, is sometimes only available for several hours per day and not always of good quality.

=== Financial arrangements and the concessions ===
Under a concession contract, a private company operates, maintains and expands infrastructure owned by the government for a given period which is usually 20 to 30 years. The private operator is in charge of financing all the investments and collects tariff revenues from the customers on behalf of the government. In exchange for its services it is allowed to earn a rate of return, which is usually derived from the tariff revenues that are usually passed on to the private operator. However, the Jakarta concessions are based on an unusual financial arrangement. It consists of water tariffs collected by the private operators on behalf of the provincial government of Jakarta, which are separate from water charges paid by the government to the private operators. The original idea was that tariffs billed to customers would be higher than charges paid to the private operators. The resulting surplus would have allowed the government to pay back the debt owed to the central government resulting from international loans. These loans had been incurred to build up the city's water infrastructure in previous years, totalling a staggering 1.6 trillion Rupiahs (US$400 million at the pre-crisis exchange rate). The charge to the private operators is a fixed amount of Rupiahs per m^{3}, independently of whether the water users are in a poor or wealthy category. It was set in such a way that the private companies would earn a rate of return of 22 percent. This charging system was designed to provide an incentive to private operators to connect the poor despite their low revenue potential. However, today the authorities question the usefulness of this system since it creates a shortfall for the public sector.

Water tariffs. Tariffs in Jakarta are differentiated between seven customer categories, with customers in the highest category paying 14 times more than those in the lowest category:

- Category I is a highly preferential tariff for social institutions such as mosques and public hydrants (1% of all connections in 2003);
- Category II includes a preferential tariff for very poor households as well as public hospitals (IIa, 12% of all connections) and poor households (IIb, 47%);
- Category III includes a regular tariff for middle-income households and small businesses (IIIa, 20%) as well as upper middle-income households and government offices (IIIb, 15%);
- Category IV is a high tariff designed to provide revenues to cross-subsidize users in the preferential tariff categories. It includes large hotels, highrise buildings, banks and factories (IVa, 5%) and the port (IVb, 1%).

Thus 6% of the wealthier customers, using a much larger share of the total volume of water sold, subsidize 60% of the water users, using a much smaller share of the water sold, who are poor. In 2010 customers in Category IVa paid 9,880 Rupiahs (US$1.00) per m^{3}, while mostly poor customers in Category II paid only 1,050 Rupiahs (US$0.11) per m^{3}. In 2006 the average water tariff in 2006 was about 6,000 Rupiahs (US$0.62). For comparison, the water charge was 7,020 Rupiahs (US$0.73) in 2007.

Deficit between water tariffs and water charges. There are two problems with this charging system: First, the water charge is indexed to inflation and is supposed to be automatically increased every six months, while water tariff increases have to be approved by the City Council. In the aftermath of the East Asian Crisis, the City Council froze the water tariff, thus creating a deficit for the government-owned Asset Holding Company Perusahaan Daerah Air Minum Jakarta Raya (PAM Jaya) as early as the second half of 1998. Second, the more poor people were connected the lower the average tariff collected would become because of the tariff structure. The public contract partner of the private companies, PAM Jaya, however, receives higher revenues from commercial customers and wealthier residential customers since these pay higher tariffs than the poor residential customers. The more poor people are connected by the private operators, the greater the deficit of the public holding company would become, since for each new poor customer it had to pay a charge to the private companies that was higher than the tariff paid by the customer. PAM Jaya thus actually discourages the private companies to connect the poor to the network by seeking a "balanced composition of connections" in order not to further increase the burden on the budget of the province of Jakarta. Indeed, between 1998 and 2004 only 25% of TPJ's new connections were in the two poorest categories, while 60% of existing customers in 2003 were in these categories. As a result of these factors, PAM Jaya has not fully paid the charges to the operators and has accumulated arrears to them. These arrears could reach Rupiahs 18.2 trillion (1.9bn USD) until the end of the contracts in 2022, if the water tariff remains frozen from 2007 until 2022.

Financing. In 1998 Palyja secured US$61 million in loans from the European Investment Bank and the Singapore-based Calyon Merchant Bank Asia. To repay these foreign-currency loans, the company sought local-currency funding. They issued a Rupiahs 650 billion bond on the Indonesian stock market in 2005. In 2007 the Asian Development Bank approved a Rupiahs 455 billion loan to Palyja. ADB did not require a government guarantee for its loan, which is a testimony to the creditworthiness of Palyja. The loan has been criticised for having been based on "careless assumptions", assuming unrealistic projections for future water sales. In 2008 Aetra followed the example of Palyja and also issued corporate bonds on the Indonesian stock market.

=== Water resources ===
Flooding. Flooding is a major problem affecting Jakarta. For example, the 2007 flood inundated more than 70 percent of the city and sent about 450,000 fleeing their homes. However, flood management is the responsibility of the government, not of the private water companies.

Groundwater over-exploitation and land subsidence. Groundwater extraction in Jakarta by far exceeds groundwater recharge, leading to a falling groundwater table and land subsidence. Land subsidence was first identified when cracks were discovered in the Sarinah bridge in 1978. Land subsidence is also caused by the weight of increasingly high buildings. It varies by neighbourhoods. Between 1993 and 2005 the largest rate of land subsidence occurred in Central Jakarta at 2.40m, from 3.42m to 1.02m above sea level. In North Jakarta the decline was 57 cm, from 2.03m to 1.46m. In West Jakarta, East Jakarta and South Jakarta the decline was 2, 11 and 28 cm only respectively. However, the private companies do not extract groundwater, but purchase bulk surface water from far outside the city limits.

Surface water used by the utilities. The private companies mostly buy raw water at a relatively low price from Perum Jasa Tirta II, a state-owned company that operates the West Tarum Canal system. The system provides 80 percent of the raw water supply for Jakarta. Its water comes from Jatiluhur reservoir on the Citarum River 70 km southeast of the city. According to a 2007 report by the Asian Development Bank, there was a risk for the water supply of Jakarta from inadequate maintenance and repair of the canal and associated pumping stations. The current water sources are insufficient to supply the growing city with its water needs and thus new water supply projects are being planned.

Aetra gets its entire raw water from the West Tarum Canal, while Palyja complements low-price raw water from the West Tarum Canal by buying bulk treated water at higher prices from the Cisadane Treatment Plant owned by Tangerang District Water Works Enterprise 30 km southwest of Jakarta. Palyja also obtains water from the polluted Kali Krukut River in South Jakarta after passing through filtration wells and after treating it. Furthermore, in times of scarcity, water from the heavily polluted Ciliwung River is used for backup supply.

== History ==
=== Prelude (1993-1997) ===
In 1993 the British water company Thames Water International set foot in Indonesia with the aim of gaining a concession contract for Jakarta. For this purpose it entered into an agreement with Sigit Harjojudanto, one of the sons of then President Suharto. Sigit's firm PT Kekar Pola Airindo – which had no experience in water supply - received 20 percent of shares in a joint venture with Thames Water. The French water company Lyonnaise des Eaux, now Suez Environnement, which had been active in Indonesia before, was afraid of being left behind. It already had a joint venture with the Salim Group of Anthony Salim, a crony of Suharto, for the production and distribution of industrial water in the Serang area of Jakarta since 1994. Together they created the joint venture PT Garuda Dipta Semesta (now called Palyja). Salim, not wanting to confront the President, was at first cautious. But when Lyonnaise des Eaux managed to convince the government to split up the Jakarta concession in two halves, each of which would be awarded without competition to one of the two groups, Salim acquiesced. In 1995 the government issued letters of invitation to Lyonnaise des Eaux and Thames Water International to begin negotiations for concessions. The two companies then completed feasibility studies in 1996. Negotiations took more than a year and were tedious. One issue was that the private companies requested to be paid in foreign currency, a request that was successfully opposed by the then Governor of Jakarta.

Apparently the World Bank had pressured the Indonesian government in the early 1990s to privatise water supply. However, the Second Jabotabek Urban Development Project, a major water project for Jakarta approved by the World Bank's board in 1990, included no conditions for privatisation.

=== Concession award (1997) ===
In June 1997 the two 25-year water concessions were awarded, becoming effective in February 1998. The subsidiary of Lyonnaise des Eaux, called PT PAM Lyonnaise Jaya (Palyja), was awarded the concession for the western part of the city while the subsidiary of Thames Water International, called Thames PAM Jaya (TPJ), was awarded the concession for the eastern part. The concessions aimed to achieve universal service coverage and a reduction of non-revenue water to 20 percent at the end of the concession period. To that end the concessions foresaw private investments of Rupiahs 1,520 billion during the first five years of the concession alone. This corresponded to US$610 million at the exchange rate at signing before the financial crisis. However, after the devaluation of the Rupiah during the East Asian financial crisis the value of these investment commitments dropped to US$160 million. In the turmoil following the toppling of Suharto, most expatriates fled the country and the Director General of PAM Jaya moved to cancel the concession contracts. British and French executives and diplomats then convinced the central government to maintain the concessions, after the foreign companies separated themselves from their Indonesian partners tainted by their association with the former regime. The City Council, after having approved tariff increases of 15 percent in February 1998 despite the crisis, was soon faced with riots and froze the tariffs for the next three years.

=== Renegotiations (2001-2004) and establishment of a regulator ===
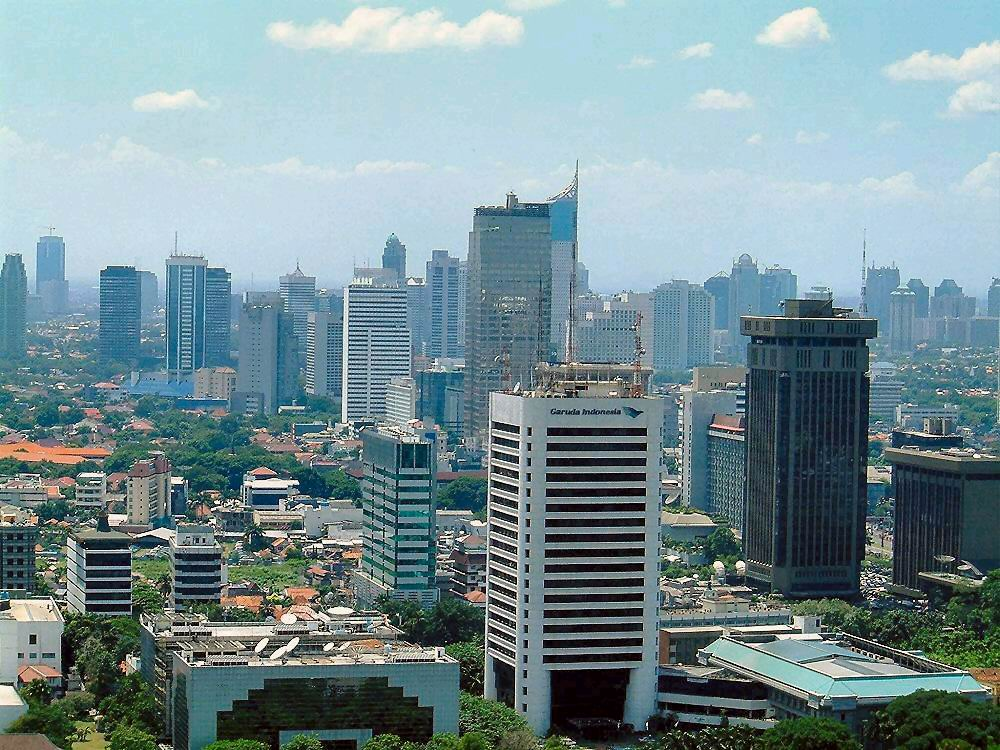
View of Jakarta.

Due to the impact of the 1997 East Asian financial crisis the contracts were renegotiated through a "Restated Cooperative Agreement" signed in October 2001. The agreement also foresaw the creation of the Jakarta Water Supply Regulatory Body (JWSRB) as an "independent" regulator in charge of supervising the concessions and reviewing requests for tariff increases on behalf of the Governor of Jakarta and the Ministry of Public Works. Initially, PAM Jaya had the responsibility to monitor the performance of the two private companies on behalf of the city government in addition to being an asset holding company. By creating the regulatory body the regulatory function was to be clearly separated from the asset holding function, thus avoiding a possible perception of a conflict of interest. In April 2001 the City Council approved a tariff increase of 35 percent, while leaving tariffs in the two poorest consumer categories unchanged. After the signing of the new contract, lengthy negotiations began with the assistance of external advisors brought in with the support of the Asian Development Bank about the so-called "rate rebasing" for the period 2002–2007. During the negotiations, two other tariff increases were approved in April 2003 and January 2004, again leaving tariffs for the poorest unchanged. For the first time since 1998, in 2003 average water tariffs became higher than water charges, standing at 5,000 and 4,000 Rupiahs per cubic meter respectively. In July 2004 the City Council approved an automatic tariff adjustment (ATA) every six months over a five-year period to allow the provincial government to pay its arrears to the private operators. The water tariff adjustment formula foresaw that increases of the water charge would be fully passed on to consumers, in addition to any changes in the financial requirements of the asset holding company PAM Jaya and the regulatory body.

In 2004 a consumer group sued the concessionaires for providing poor services, based on a survey carried out by the Peoples Coalition for The Rights to Water (KRuHA). The lawyers of the utilities rejected the claims saying that the evidence presented was poor and that the survey to support the claims was not carried out by an independent agency.

=== Exit of Thames Water and freeze of water tariffs and charges (2006-2009) ===
In January 2006 Jakarta Governor Sutiyoso and the City Council delayed a raise in water tariffs due to protests by city councillors. In the same year Suez Environnement reduced its share in the concession to 51 percent in a move that, according to the company, had been planned long before. The remaining shares were sold to PT Astratel Nusantara (30 percent), which is part of the Indonesian conglomerate Astra International, and Citigroup of the US (19 percent). Shortly afterwards Thames Water completely exited the Indonesian market by selling 95 percent of its share in TPJ to Acuatico, a consortium of Indonesia's ReCapital Advisors and Glendale Partners. While both mother companies of Acuatico had no operating experience in the water sector, Acuatico itself had provided water to commercial customers in Jakarta before. The new owners retained the management of TPJ, but the name of the TPJ was subsequently changed to PT Aetra Air Jakarta (Aetra).

Governor Fauzi Bowo, who was elected as the successor of Governor Sutiyoso in 2007, froze the water tariffs, saying that the companies did not achieve their contractual targets. In 2008 performance targets were further reduced as part of the rate rebasing for the period 2008–2012. In 2009 water tariffs were also frozen.

=== Renegotiations and exit of Suez (2011-2012) ===
In 2011 the provincial parliament of Jakarta instructed PAM Jaya to begin negotiations with the two companies since it considered the contracts one-sided and disadvantageous to PAM Jaya. The negotiations reportedly stalled, and PAM Jaya director Maurits Napitupulu was removed in December 2011. The situation of Palyja was the subject of a letter from the CEO of GDF Suez, Gerald Mestrallet, to the Indonesian Coordinating Minister of Economic Affairs, and were discussed at a meeting between then French Prime Minister Francois Fillon and the President of Indonesia in July 2011. The high level of these discussions suggest that the provincial government of Jakarta as the formal contractual partner is not the only interlocutor of the private companies in the negotiations. Meanwhile, voices including the Amrta Institute for Water Literacy, the Jakarta Water Labor Union and many NGOs have called for the contracts to be terminated instead of engaging in negotiations, despite the threat of penalties for early termination estimated at 3.1 trillion Rupiahs (US$347 million) to Palyja and 2.8 trillion Rupiahs (US$313 million) to Aetra.

In October 2012 Suez Environnement announced that it would sell its 51% share in Palyja to Manila Water, under the condition that the city council provided a letter of support. In June 2013 the city council and PAM Jaya, however, announced that they did not approve the sale, which was called off. The city instead announced its intention to buy the shares itself.

=== Court case against privatization (since 2013) ===
The Coalition of Jakarta Residents Opposing Water Privatization (KMMSAJ) initiated a petition against the private management of Jakarta's water supply with 588 signatories in 2011 and supported a similar petition in court by 12 people in 2013. On 24 March 2015 the Central Jakarta District Court ruled that the terms of the privatisation of Jakarta's water violated the common right to water guaranteed by Article 33 of the Constitution of Indonesia. The court also noted that the private operators were "negligent in fulfilling the human right to water for Jakarta's residents." The government of Indonesia and the private operators lodged an appeal against the court decision. The concessions remained in place pending a final court decision. In February 2016, the appeal court reversed the district court decision on the ground that the claimants did not have standing to bring the claim. The claimants brought an appeal to the Supreme Court.

== Impact ==
The concession contracts included specific targets for service coverage, water production, water sales and non-revenue water. The contracts also foresaw that by the 2008, the tenth contract year, drinking water quality standards had to be met and that water supply had to be continuous at a pressure of 7.5 meters water column. Until 2004 both private operators succeeded to increase the share of the population with access to water and reduced water losses in line with the renegotiated contractual targets. After 2004 they further increased access and reduced water losses, but did not reach the targets any more. Overall, from 1998 to 2008 access to water increased from 46 to 64 percent (revised target: 68 percent) and water losses were reduced from 61 percent to 50 percent (revised target: 42 percent). After targets were reduced to more realistic levels in 2008, the operators were able to reach most of their new targets.

=== Overall access ===
Estimates of how access to piped water changed during the concession period vary considerably. According to the regulatory agency, access increased substantially. In the Palyja service area it almost doubled from 209,000 customers in 1998 to 399,000 customers in 2008, exceeding the renegotiated contractual target of 392,000. In the TPJ service area it increased less quickly during the same period from 278,000 to 380,000 customers, somewhat below the target of 403,000. In relative terms, Palyja says that in its concession area access almost doubled from 34 percent in 1998 to 59 percent in 2007 and 64 percent in 2011. In the TPJ service area, access increased from about 57 percent in 1998 to about 67 percent in 2004, but stagnated afterwards. However, the annual national socio-economic surveys (SUSENAS) of the National Statistical Agency BPS for the Special Capital City District (DKI) of Jakarta show a decline in the share of households with access to an improved water source from 59 percent in 1998 to 39 percent in 2008 and 28 percent in 2010. It remains unclear what could have caused such a massive decline, and substantial increases and decreases in the BPS figures from one year to the other cast a shadow of doubt on the reliability of these figures.

=== Access by the poor ===
The private companies have specifically attempted to improve the supply of clean drinking water to slum areas where house connections are difficult because residents do not own the land on which they live. However, these attempts have been fairly limited. For example, Palyja has installed so-called Master Meters, from which residents in communities can connect themselves with the assistance of NGOs such as Mercy Corps. As of 2012, however, there were only 3 Master Meters, one in Rawa Bebek and 2 in Jembatan Besi. The Master Meters provide cleaner water than water vendors at about half the costs to households, but the impact of the program is minimal because of its limited size. In addition, Palyja has built 47 water kiosks in or near slum areas where residents can obtain clean water. Piped connections were also expanded. One example is a project in Western Jakarta under which Palyja connected more than 5,000 poor households and was reimbursed through an output-based aid grant from the Global Partnership on Output-Based Aid. As part of the project connection fees were reduced to US$13, or less than one tenth of the usual fee. 75 percent of the subsidy was paid to PALYJA upon independent verification of the installation of a working connection and the remaining 25 percent after verification of three consecutive months of satisfactory service delivery. Another example is in Marunda where TPJ completely waived connection fees and even installed in-house connections for free for 1,600 households using a grant from Thames Water. It allowed the poorest households to pay the connection fee in 12 monthly instalments through the water bill. However, these efforts have been limited in part because there are disincentives to connect the poor even when they have a legal title to their land. These disincentives existed when the system was managed publicly and remain in place under private management: Revenues from poor customers are low, thus increasing the deficit of the entities in charge of service provision; the cost of connecting the poor in dense existing settlements is higher than connecting new middle-income settlements; and finally a "mafia" of water vendors and hydrant operators defends its monopoly of selling water to the poor at high prices, sometimes even through violent intimidation of customers, competing vendors, the police and city officials.

=== Water sales ===
The concession contracts included contractual targets to increase the volume of water sold. Water sales did increase substantially without any increase in bulk water supply, but still not as much as foreseen in the contracts. In the western half, the volume increased from 89 million m^{3} per year in 1998 to 130 in 2007 and 153 in 2011. In the eastern half it increased from about 90 million m^{3} per year to more than 140 in 2004. However, it then declined to about 120 in 2007, far below the contractual target.

=== Service quality ===
According to a survey by the regulatory body in 2007, only 30 percent of those connected to the public water network enjoyed continuous water supply. On average, customers received water 12 hours per day. Tap water quality, at least in some areas and at some times, is poor: For example, residents of Cilincing, North Jakarta, have complained that their tap water has been cloudy for two months and blame skin irritation and diarrhoe on the poor water supply. According to interviews with residents in South and West Jakarta, shown in a 2011 video by the Amrta Institute for Water Literacy, service quality has actually deteriorated since the concessions began. One of the reasons is that, because of low pressure, some customers pump directly from the pipes, therefore sucking dirty groundwater through leakages of the pipes.

=== Water losses ===
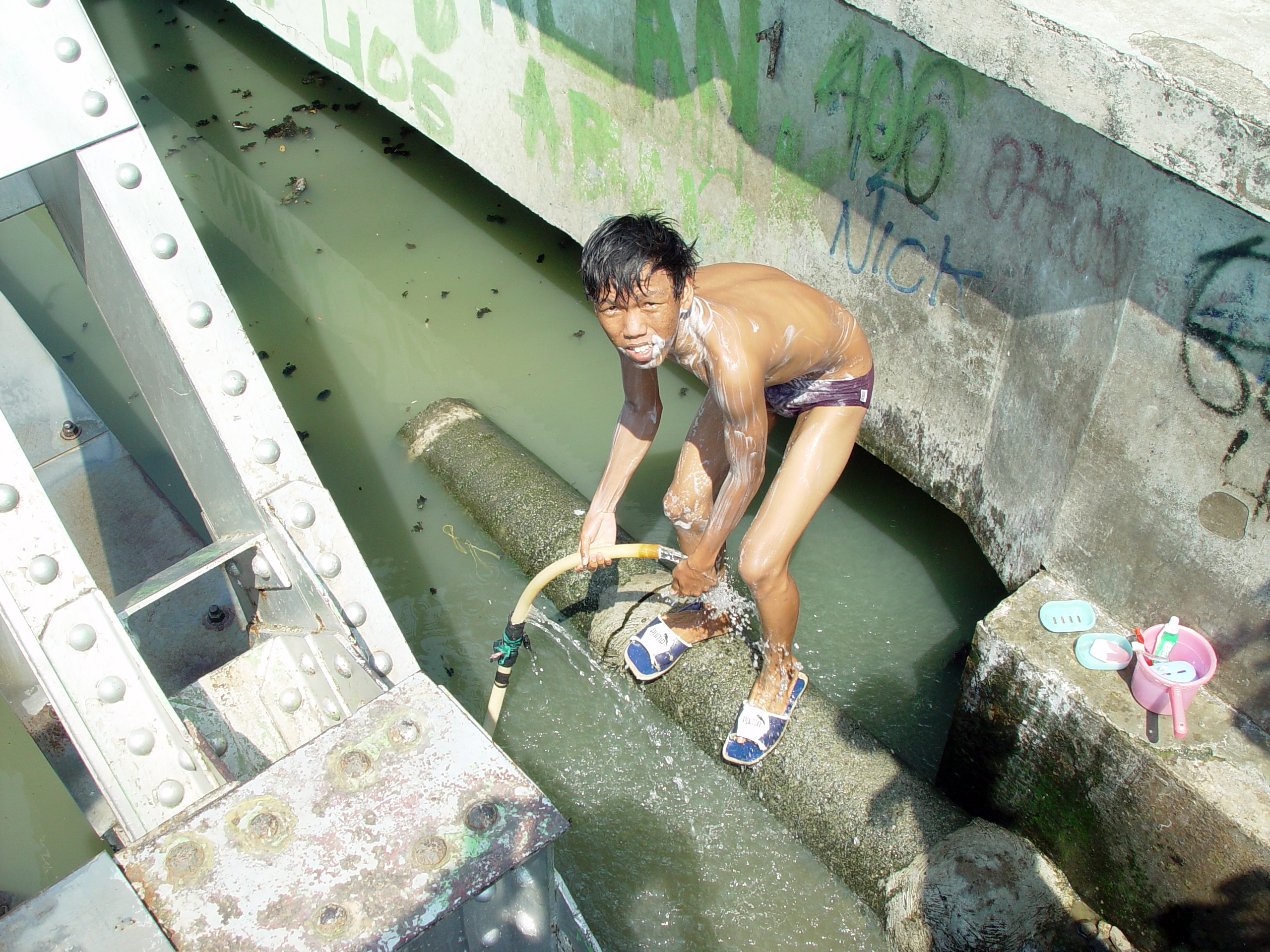
A boy takes a shower from what may be an illegal water connection, illustrating the complicated notion of "water losses" in a city characterised by widespread poverty.

Water losses have been reduced, but much slower than foreseen in the concession contracts. In the eastern half, they have increased again between 2003 and 2007. According to Palyja, in its western half of the concession non-revenue water declined from 57 percent in 1998 to 47 percent in 2007 and 37 percent in 2012. According to data from the Jakarta Water Supply Regulatory Body non-revenue water in the eastern half declined from 58 percent in 1998 to 44 percent in 2003, but then increased again to 52 percent. This compares unfavorably with the 2007 target of 34 percent. Water losses include illegal connections, some of which are used by the poor to serve their basic needs.

=== Tariffs ===
Tariff increases. Between 1998 and 2010 the water tariff increased threefold, from 375 to 1,050 Rupiahs (US$0.04 to US$0.12) per m^{3} in the lowest category and from 5,200 to 14,650 Rupiahs (US$0.58 to US$1.63) in the highest category. This far exceeded the growth of household income during the same period and thus increased the burden of water tariffs on all water consumers, including the poor.

Affordability. According to a study by the Atma Jaya Catholic University of Indonesia in 2008, the share of the water bill in the income of a poor family (tariff Category II) was 2.8 percent. According to Palyja, the corresponding figure for 2009 in its service area was only 1.6 percent.

Comparison with other cities. At an average of US$0.70/m^{3} water tariffs were higher than in other Indonesian cities in 2005. They were similar to those in Manila (US$0.60/m^{3} and US$0.71/m^{3} in East and West Manila respectively in 2008), higher than in Kuala Lumpur (US$0.45/m^{3} in 2007), but lower than in Singapore (US$1.22/m^{3} in 2012).

=== Profitability ===
The concession contracts fixed a 22 percent annual rate of return for the private operators. The net profit of Palyja varied between Rp 58 million (9 percent of sales) in 2005 and Rp 137 million (15 percent of sales) in 2008. Palyja's financial statement for 2010 shows an even higher profit of Rp 216 billion (US$25 million), and Aetra's 2010 profit was Rp 142 billion (US$16 million). However, these profits are based on the assumption that the unpaid water charges billed to PAM Jaya will be fully paid to the operators. Actually, these charges are not being paid and writing off these unpaid bills, as it may become necessary, would significantly reduce the profits shown on the financial statements of the companies.

=== Customer satisfaction ===
The Regulatory Body for Water Services has conducted customer satisfaction surveys covering the entire service area since 2003. In 2007 the survey showed the following levels of satisfaction among respondents: 85 percent for water quality, 71 percent for continuity, 64 percent for pressure, but only 28 percent for responsiveness to complaints. Palyja has conducted its own annual customer satisfaction surveys in its service area through the opinion research institute Taylor Nelson Sofres (TNS) Indonesia since 2005. According to these figures, customer satisfaction increased from 57 percent in 2005 to 75 percent in 2011. According to a survey carried out by Atma Jaya Catholic University of Indonesia in 2008, more than 70% of customers were satisfied with water pressure, water quality, continuity of supply, meter reading and billing. However, less than half the customers that made a complaint were satisfied with the response to the complaint.

== See also ==
- Water supply and sanitation in Indonesia
- Water privatisation
