= Health in Indonesia =

Health in Indonesia is affected by a number of factors. Indonesia has over 26,000 health care facilities; 2,000 hospitals, 9,000 community health centres and private clinics, 1,100 dentist clinics and 1,000 opticians. The country lacks doctors with only 0.4 doctors per 1,000 population. In 2018, Indonesia's healthcare spending was US$38.3 billion, 4.18% of their GDP, and is expected to rise to US$51 billion in 2020.

In 2014, Indonesia introduced its universal healthcare program, the Jaminan Kesehatan Nasional (JKN), which is provided by BPJS Kesehatan (Badan Penyelenggara Jaminan Sosial Kesehatan, Health Social Security Agency). It is currently covering over 200 million people. Around 20 million people in Indonesia is covered by private health insurance.

The Human Rights Measurement Initiative finds that Indonesia is fulfilling 84.1% of what it should be fulfilling for the right to health based on its level of income. When looking at the right to health with respect to children, Indonesia achieves 93.5% of what is expected based on its current income. In regards to the right to health amongst the adult population, the country achieves only 87.1% of what is expected based on the nation's level of income. Indonesia falls into the "very bad" category when evaluating the right to reproductive health because the nation is fulfilling only 71.9% of what the nation is expected to achieve based on the resources (income) it has available.

== Population ==
As of September 2020, Indonesia has a population of 247 million and a population density of 151 per km^{2}. 29% of the population of Indonesia are under 15 years old, and only 5% are over 65.

=== Life expectancy ===
Life expectancy in Indonesia since 1927

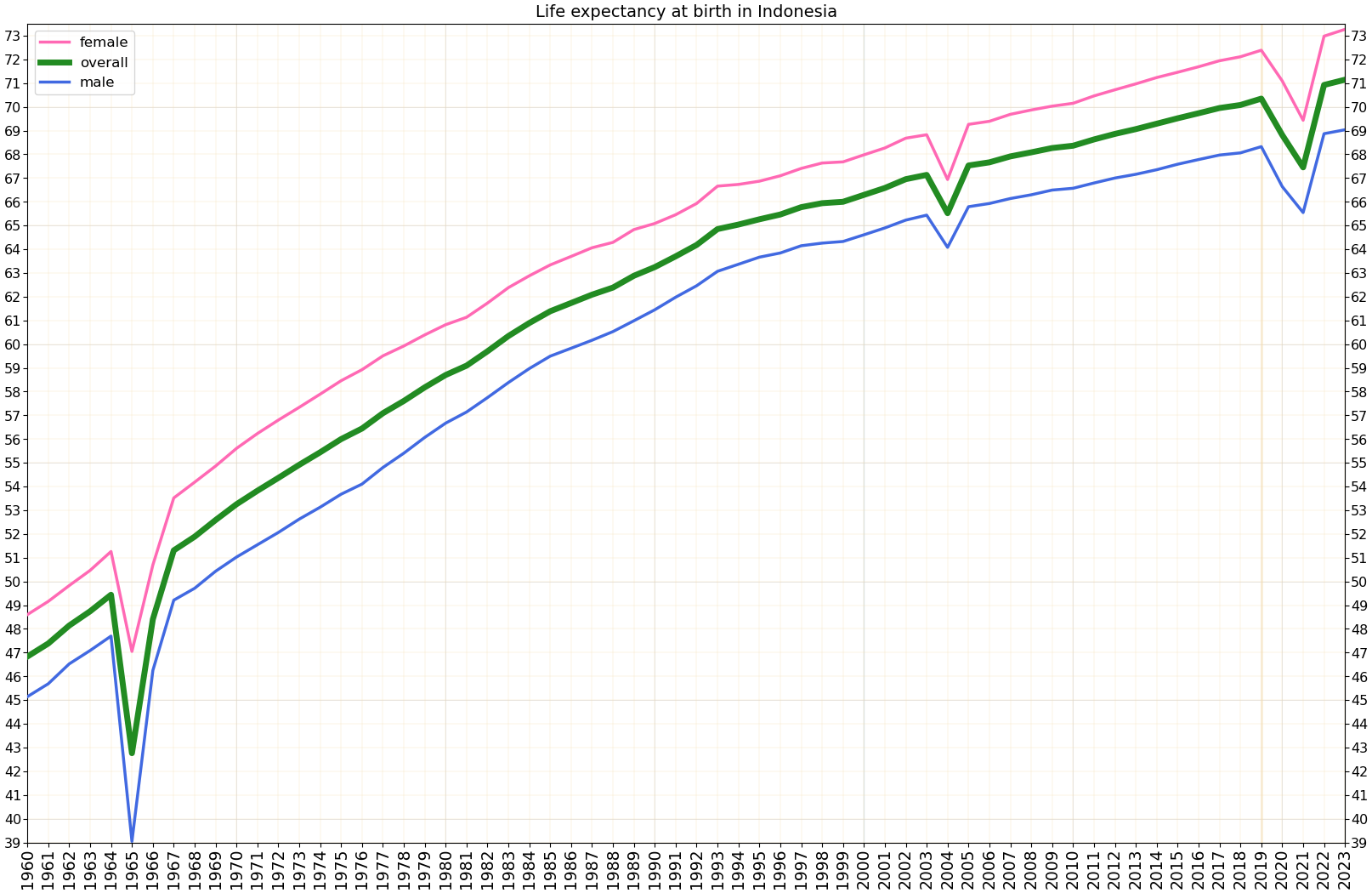
Life expectancy in Indonesia since 1960 by gender

Period	Life expectancy in years	Period	Life expectancy in years
1950–1955	41.75	1985–1990	61.29
1955–1960	45.07	1990–1995	63.32
1960–1965	48.18	1995–2000	65.16
1965–1970	51.05	2000–2005	66.40
1970–1975	54.02	2005–2010	68.31
1975–1980	56.69	2010–2015	70.01
1980–1985	59.21	2015–2020	71.41

Source: United Nations

=== Mortality rate ===
Observed deaths per 1000 live births	1990	2000	2010	2019
Under 28 days	30.6	22.8	17.4	12.4
Under 1 year	61.8	41	28	20.2
Under 5 years	84	52.2	33.9	23.9

Source: The World Bank

=== Fertility ===
Year	Births per women	Rate
2017	2.346	1.1% decline from 2016
2018	2.320	1.11% decline from 2017
2019	2.300	0.86% decline from 2018
2020	2.280	0.87% decline from 2019

Source: Macrotrends

=== Maternal and child healthcare ===
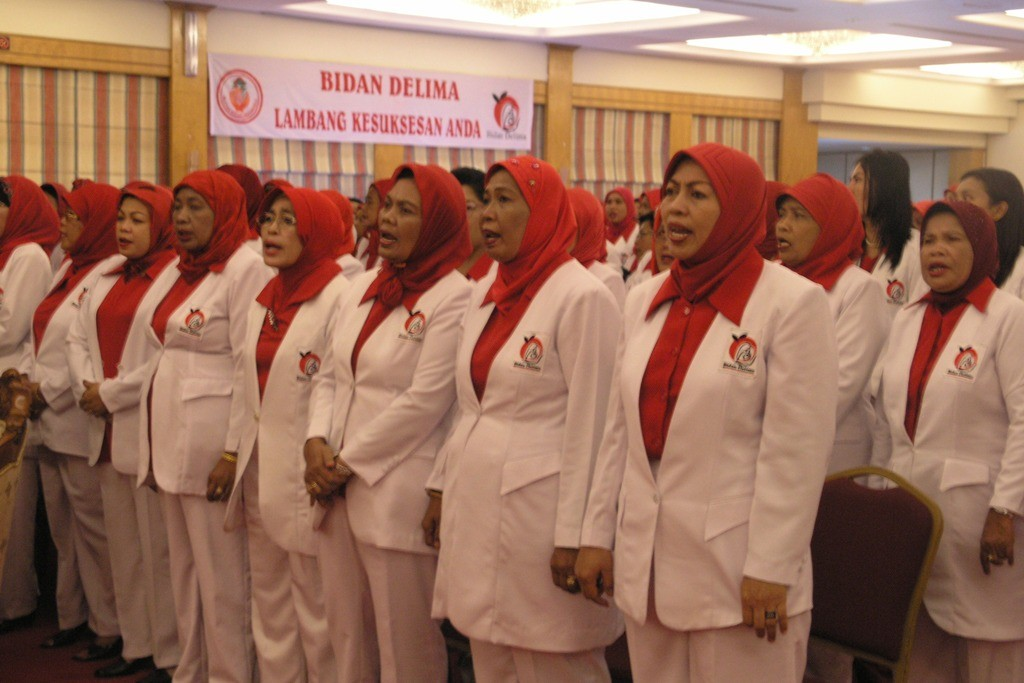
Newly certified midwives in South Sulawesi, Indonesia

The 2010 maternal mortality rate per 100,000 births for Indonesia is 240. This is compared with 228.6 in 2008 and 252.9 in 1990. The under 5 mortality rate, per 1,000 births is 41 and the neonatal mortality as a percentage of under 5's mortality is 49. In Indonesia the number of midwives per 1,000 live births is unavailable and the lifetime risk of death for pregnant women is 1 in 190.

The 2012 maternal mortality rate per 100,000 live births is 359 deaths, a significant increased from 2010 data with 220 deaths and far from the MDGs goal of 102 deaths by the end of 2015. The main cause of deaths are severe post-natal bleeding due to lack of pregnancy regular control, although National Family Planning Coordination Board and the Central Statistics Agency data showed improvement from 93 percent of women received prenatal care in 2007 increased to 96 percent in 2012.

== Quality and lifestyle ==
=== Climate change ===
The effect of climate change can also be seen in the health of people in Indonesia (heat-related illnesses, respiratory disease, vector-borne disease, waterborne disease, malnutrition). There have been several studies, which show the correlation between the effect of climate change on health issues like the respiratory system, malaria transmission, and increased risk of vector-borne disease. Other factors like bad water and air quality, and malnutrition are other indirect effects that climate change has on people's health.

Collectively, these studies demonstrate that urgent action is necessary both to limit further damage from climate change and to adapt current public health strategies accordingly.

=== Water quality ===
Unsafe drinking water is a major cause of diarrhoea, which is a major killer of young children in Indonesia. According to UNICEF diarrhoea caused by untreated drinking water contributed to the death of 31% of children between the age of 1 month to a year, and 25% of children between a year to 4 years old.

=== Air quality ===
1997 Southeast Asian haze, 2006 Southeast Asian haze, 2013 Southeast Asian haze and 2015 Southeast Asian haze - In all countries affected by the smoke haze, an increase of acute health outcomes was observed. Health effects including emergency room visits due to respiratory symptoms such as asthma, upper respiratory infection, decreased lung function as well as eye and skin irritation, were caused mainly by this particulate matter.

=== Unhealthy diet ===
At least 1 in 3 children under five are either undernourished or overweight in Indonesia. According to UNICEF, 7 million children under-five are stunted, 2 million are wasted and 2 million are overweight or obese. Also, 1 in 4 adolescents are anaemic, most likely due to deficiency in vitamins and nutrients such as iron, folic acid and vitamin A.

=== Tobacco and drug use ===
Indonesia is the fifth largest tobacco market in the world and does not have very strict rules on smoking. Every year, more than 200,000 people are killed by tobacco caused diseases. However, more than 469,000 children (10–14 years) and 64 million adults (15+ years) continue to use tobacco products every day.

Drug use and selling drugs is completely illegal and can result in the death penalty. In 2015, 4.5 million Indonesians need to be rehabilitated due to illicit or illegal drug use and around 45 young people die each day due to drug use.

=== Mental health and suicide ===
There is a high stigma against mental illness in Indonesia. The Indonesian government currently uses 1% of its total health budget on mental health with only 48 mental hospitals and 269 psychiatric wards. The conditions of these places are unhygienic and overcrowded with inmates regularly shackled to prevent violence.

Suicide is a problem in Indonesia and in 2018 ranks 65 with 2.9 suicides per 100,000. Suicides are often unreported due to stigma, approximately 10,000 people commit suicide per year.

== Diseases ==
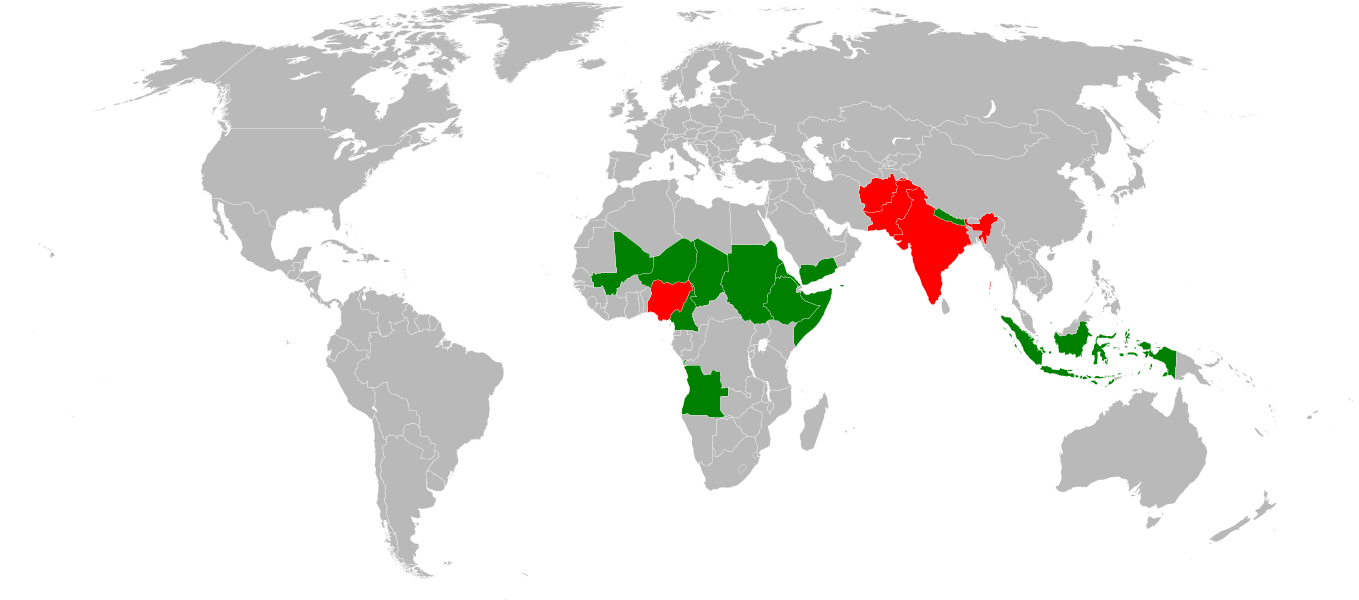
In 2005 there were 303 reported cases of polio in Indonesia.

=== Communicable diseases ===
HIV/AIDS has posed a major public health threat since the early 1990s. In 2003 Indonesia ranked third among ASEAN nations in Southeast Asia, after Myanmar and Thailand, with a 0.1 percent adult prevalence rate, 130,000 HIV/AIDS cases, and 2,400 deaths. In Jakarta it is estimated that 17 percent of prostitutes have contracted HIV/AIDS; in some parts of Papua, it is thought that the rate of infection among village women who are not prostitutes may be as high as 26 percent.

Three other health hazards facing Indonesia in 2004 were dengue fever, dengue haemorrhagic fever (DHF) and avian influenza. All 30 provincial-level units were affected by dengue fever and DHF, according to the WHO. The outbreak of highly pathogenic avian influenza (A/H5N1) in chickens and ducks in Indonesia was said to pose a significant threat to human health.

By 2010, there were three malaria regions in Indonesia: Nusa Tenggara Barat with 20 cases per 1,000 citizens, Nusa Tenggara Timur with 20–50, and Maluku and Papua with more than 50 cases per thousand. The medium endemicity in Sumatra, Kalimantan and Sulawesi, whereas low endemicity is in Java and Bali which almost 100 percent of malaria cases have been confirmed clear. At 1990 malaria average incidence was 4.96 per 1,000 and declined to 1.96 per 1000 at 2010. The government is targeting to rid the country of malaria by 2030 and elimination means to achieve less than 1 incidence per 1,000 people.

=== Noncommunicable diseases ===
Noncommunicable diseases are estimated to account for 73% of all deaths in Indonesia. Diabetes is increasing at a rate of about 6% a year.

Disease	Proportional mortality
Cardiovascular diseases	35%
Communicable, maternal, perinatal and nutritional conditions	21%
Other noncommunicable diseases	12%
Cancers	12%
Chronic respiratory diseases	6%
Diabetes	6%
Injuries	6%

== Vaccination ==
While the Ikatan Dokter Anak Indonesia-IDAI (Indonesian Pediatric Society) recommends vaccinating against 16 different diseases, only five are mandatory and free for all national health insurance (BPJS) participants. The mandatory vaccinations are: Tuberculosis (TB), Hepatitis B, Polio, DTP (diphtheria, tetanus, pertussis) and Measles. Almost 60% of Indonesians are BPJS participants.

== See also ==
- Healthcare in Indonesia
- HIV/AIDS in Indonesia
- COVID-19 pandemic in Indonesia
- Water supply and sanitation in Indonesia
- Environmental issues in Indonesia
- Smoking in Indonesia
- Disability in Indonesia
- Afflictions: Culture & Mental Illness in Indonesia
- List of hospitals in Indonesia
- Food poisoning incidents in Indonesia's Free Nutritious Meals Program
