= BPJS Ketenagakerjaan =

Indonesian employment social security agency

- Native name: Badan Penyelenggara Jaminan Sosial Ketenagakerjaan
- Formerly: Yayasan Dana Jaminan Sosial; Perum Astek; PT Jamsostek (Persero)
- Type: Public agency
- Industry: Social security
- Founded: January 1, 2014 (as BPJS Ketenagakerjaan); Fully operational from 1 July 2015
- Headquarters: Grha BPJAMSOSTEK, Jl. Jenderal Gatot Subroto No. 79, South Jakarta, Jakarta, Indonesia
- Key people: Saiful Hidayat (President Director); Dedi Hardianto (Chair, Supervisory Board)
- Website: www.bpjsketenagakerjaan.go.id

Badan Penyelenggara Jaminan Sosial Ketenagakerjaan (BPJS Ketenagakerjaan, lit. 'Employment Social Security Administering Agency') is an Indonesian public legal entity that gives workers protection against the social and economic risks of employment, such as accidents, death, old age and job loss. It is one of two social security agencies in the country, alongside BPJS Kesehatan, which handles health insurance.

The agency was formerly known as Jamsostek (Jaminan Sosial Tenaga Kerja) and run by the state-owned company PT Jamsostek (Persero). Under Law No. 24 of 2011, PT Jamsostek became BPJS Ketenagakerjaan on 1 January 2014, and it began full operations on 1 July 2015.

== History ==
Programmes to protect Indonesian workers have a long history. The first organisation was the Yayasan Dana Jaminan Sosial (YDJS), established in 1952 under ministerial regulations governing assistance with workers' healthcare. In 1977, Government Regulation No. 33 made the Asuransi Sosial Tenaga Kerja (Astek) scheme compulsory for private employers and state-owned enterprises, and Regulation No. 34 created Perum Astek to run it. Law No. 3 of 1992 then introduced Jamsostek, and Government Regulation No. 36 of 1995 named PT Jamsostek as its administrator.

In 2004 the government issued Law No. 40 on the National Social Security System, followed in 2011 by Law No. 24 on Social Security Agencies. When the second law took effect, PT Jamsostek became a public legal entity without being liquidated. Its health programme was handed over to PT Askes, which became BPJS Kesehatan on the same day. The agency ran work accident (JKK), death (JKM) and old-age (JHT) programmes from the start, and added the pension programme (JP) on 1 July 2015.

A fifth programme, job loss insurance (JKP), was launched in February 2022.

== Programmes and contributions ==
Membership is compulsory for everyone who works in Indonesia, including foreigners who stay at least six months. Employers and workers split the contributions as follows:

Contribution rates for wage earners
Programme	Employer	Worker
Work accident (JKK)	0.24–1.74% depending on industry risk	–
Death (JKM)	0.3%	–
Old-age (JHT)	3.7%	2%
Pension (JP)	2%	1%

Contributions for old-age and pension coverage are the only ones deducted from workers' pay. Job loss insurance carries no separate charge for members.

When a worker has an accident, dies, grows old or retires, the agency pays benefits. Old-age insurance pays a member's accumulated savings as a lump sum once the conditions for withdrawal are met. Pension insurance pays a monthly benefit from retirement age, which started at 56 and rises by one year every three years. It has been 59 since 2025. Laid-off workers receive a cash benefit for up to six months, along with job training and access to labour market information.

At the end of 2025 the agency had 48.65 million active participants.

== See also ==
- BPJS Kesehatan
- Social security
