= Water supply and sanitation in Indonesia =

Data
- Access to an at least basic water source: 94% (2022)
- Access to at least basic sanitation: 88% (2022)
- Average urban water use (L/person/day): 130 (2004)
- Average urban water and sanitation tariff (US$/m^{3}): 0.77 (Jakarta, ca. 2008)
- Annual investment in WSS: US$2 per capita (2005 estimate)

Institutions
- Decentralization to municipalities: Substantial
- National water and sanitation company: None
- Water and sanitation regulator: None
- Responsibility for policy setting: Ministry of Health and Ministry of Home Affairs
- Sector law: No
- No. of urban service providers: 319
- No. of rural service providers: n/a

Water supply and sanitation in Indonesia is characterized by poor levels of access and service quality. More than 16 million people lack access to an at least basic water source and almost 31 million of the country's 285 million population has no access to at least basic sanitation. Only about 2% of people have access to sewerage in Jakarta; this is one of the lowest in the world among middle-income countries. Water pollution is widespread on Bali and Java. Women in Jakarta reportedly spend US$1 per day on boiling water, implying a significant burden for the poor.

In 2005, the estimated level of public investment was only US$2 per capita a year, which was insufficient to expand services significantly and to properly maintain assets. Furthermore, policy responsibilities were fragmented between different Ministries. Since decentralization was introduced in Indonesia in 2001 local governments (districts) gained responsibility for water supply and sanitation. However, this had not translated into an improvement of access or service quality, mainly because devolution of responsibilities had not been followed by adequate fund channeling mechanisms to carry out this responsibility. Local utilities remained underfunded.

The provision of clean drinking water had not yet been taken up as a development priority, particularly at the provincial government level. The lack of access to clean water and sanitation remains a persistent issue, especially in slums and rural areas. This causes concern because lack of clean water reduces the level of hygiene in the communities and it also raises the probability of people contracting diarrheal diseases or other waterborne diseases, especially children. A failure to promote behavior change, particularly among low-income families and slum dwellers, has further worsened the health impact of Indonesia's water and sanitation situation.

== Water resources and use ==
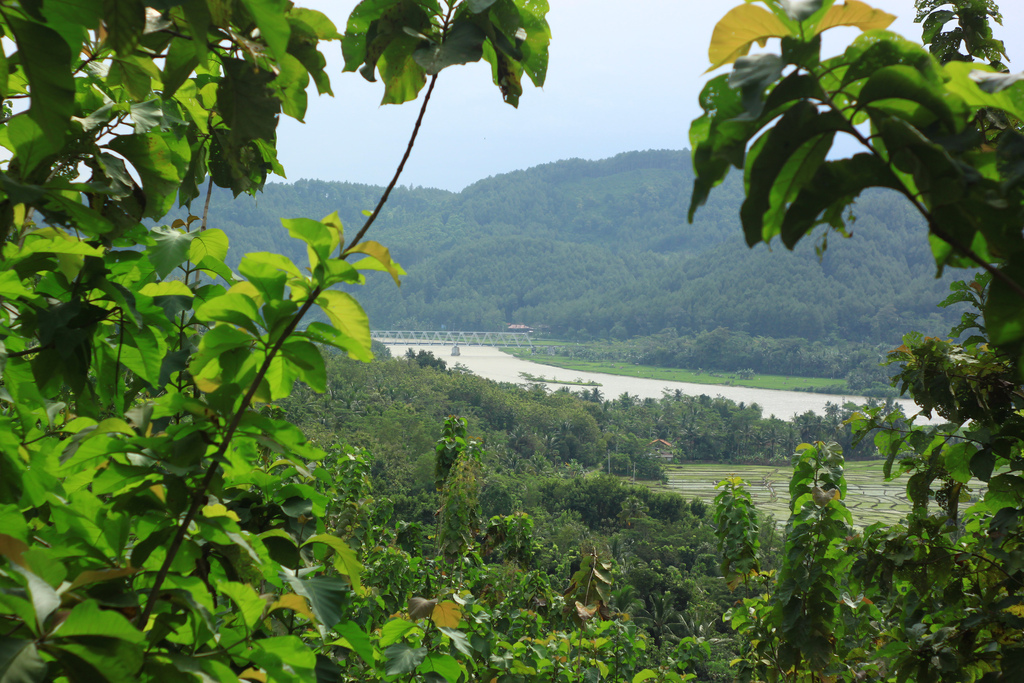
Most rivers in Indonesia, such as the Serayu River in Central Java shown here, are relatively short, seasonal and carry a high sediment load.

Indonesia has over 5,590 rivers, most of them short and steep. Because of high rainfall intensities most rivers carry large quantities of sediment. Average rainfall is above 2,000 mm (79 in) on most islands, except for the Lesser Sunda Islands where it is 1,500 mm (59 in). 80% of rain falls during the rainy season (October to April). While water resources are quite abundant in Sumatra, Kalimantan, Sulawesi, Maluku and Irian, water shortages occur during the dry season in parts of Java, Bali and the Lesser Sunda Islands. In particular in Java, the dry season flows are inadequate to meet the demand, leading to irrigation shortages. Irrigation accounts for 93% of water use. The total storage capacity amounts to only 5–6% of the river flows. Construction of reservoirs is constrained by lack of good reservoir sites, high density of population at possible reservoir sites and expected short reservoir lifetimes due to siltation. Groundwater potential in Indonesia is very limited. However, much of the eastern islands depend on groundwater because of surface water scarcity. Groundwater overexploitation occurs in heavily populated coastal areas of Java, including in Jakarta and Semarang. In Jakarta, it has caused seawater intrusion up to 10 km (6.2 mi) from the coast and land subsidence at a rate of 2–34 cm/year in east Jakarta. In Semarang, land subsidence occurs at a rate of 9 cm/year.

Water utilities abstract water from rivers and lakes (60%), springs (25%) and groundwater (15%). For example, the main water source for Jakarta is the Jatiluhur Dam on the Citarum River 70 km (43 mi) southeast of the city. For those who are self-supplied or receive water from community-based organizations, shallow groundwater and springs are by far the main sources of water on most islands. On Sumatra and Irian, however, rainwater harvesting is also an important water source.

=== Pollution ===
Domestic sewage, industrial effluents, agricultural runoff, and mismanaged solid waste are polluting surface and groundwater, especially in Java. Indonesia ranks among the worst countries in Asia in sewerage and sanitation coverage. Few Indonesian cities possess even minimal sanitation systems. The absence of an established sanitation network forces many households to rely upon private septic tanks or to dispose of their waste directly into rivers and canals. The commonality of the latter practice, together with the prevalence of polluted shallow wells used for drinking water supply in urban areas, has led to repeated epidemics of gastrointestinal infections.

=== Domestic waste ===
According to Water Environment Partnership in Asia (WEPA), only 42.8% from 51,372,661 houses in Indonesia have domestic waste treatment. More than half of households dispose their domestic waste directly to the river body. Data from the World Bank shows that in 2008, only 52% of Indonesian population has an adequate access to excreta disposal facilities. Such facilities are important as they can help to minimize human, animal, and insect contact with excreta, thereby increasing the hygiene level and enhancing the living conditions for the slum-dwellers. Without proper construction and maintenance of these facilities, domestic wastes are disposed ineffectively and increases the rate of water resources degradation.

=== Industrial waste ===
Industrial activities wastes such as small-scale industries, agriculture, textile, pulp and paper, petrochemical, mining and oil and gas also contribute to the degradation of water quality in Indonesia. Water quality in locations near to the mining areas is potentially contaminated by heavy metal such as mercury (Hg). According to WEPA, some level of mercury (Hg) concentration has been detected at 9 out of 16 sampling points and the highest level of dissolved mercury in one of the area reach 2.78 ug/L.

Therefore, the result of water quality monitoring in 30 rivers in Indonesia indicates that most of river water qualities do not end up meeting water criteria class 1, i.e. water that can be used for standard water, drinking water, and or other usage that requires the same water quality with such usage, due to pollution by domestic and industrial wastes (drinking water raw based on Government Regulation Number 82, 2001, Water Quality Management and Wastewater Controlling).

== Access ==
Indicators	Service levels	Urban	Rural	Total
Improved water source	Basic services	97.6%	85.7%	92.4%
Improved water source	Piped water	44.6%	21.4%	34.6%
Improved sanitation	Basic services	91.6%	79.7%	86.5%
Improved sanitation	Sewerage (2010)	2%	0%	1%

Data on access to water and sanitation in Indonesia varies depending on the source consulted and the definition of access. In 2020, access to an improved water source stood at 92% and access to improved sanitation at 86% in 2020.

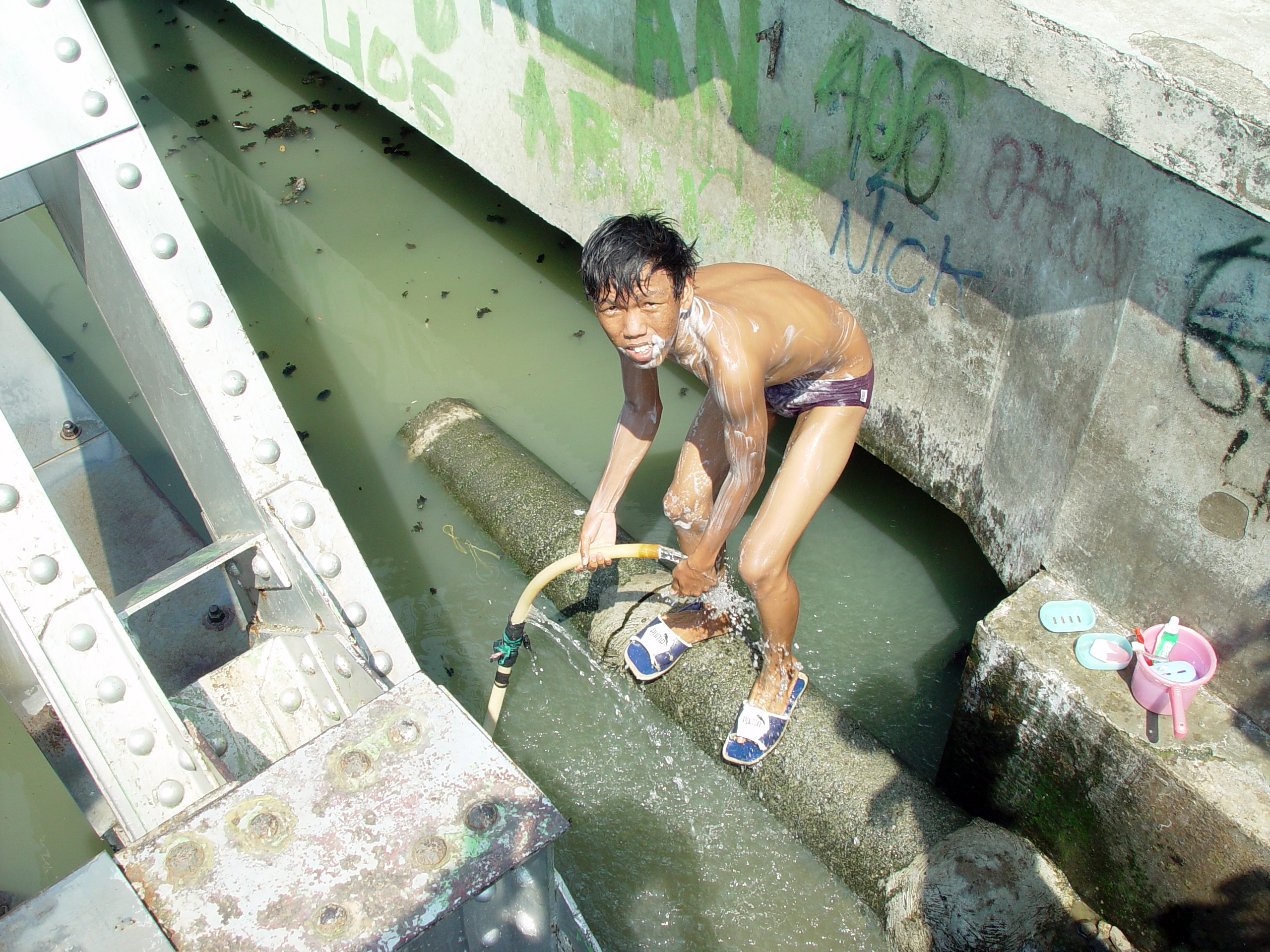
Because of lack of clean water, slum inhabitants in Jakarta have to resort to wash themselves using water from canals.

Indonesia has one of the lowest sewerage coverage levels in Asia with only 2% access in urban areas. Most excreta and wastewater are discharged untreated or semi-treated into local drains or water bodies, causing massive environmental pollution. Dense housing, severe seasonal flooding and the choking of drains with uncollected solid waste exacerbate the problem. According to the World Bank, urban sanitation is the least well addressed of major policy issues in Indonesia. In rural areas, access to improved sanitation has increased from 23% in 2000 to 80% in 2020. In 2020, 6.1% use shared latrines, 1.4% use unsanitary open pits, and 6.1% defecate in fields, beaches and water bodies.

== Service quality ==
No data is available on the average continuity of water supply in Indonesian cities. However, in Jakarta, 92% of users received continuous water supply in 2001. Concerning drinking water quality, about 30% of the water distributed by water companies in the country is contaminated with E. coli or fecal coliforms and other pathogens. The results of drinking water quality tests are not made public. Most Indonesians do not dare to drink water directly from the tap and boil water or buy bottled water, if they can afford it.

== Health impact of inadequate water supply and sanitation ==
Unsafe drinking water is a major cause of diarrhea, which is the second leading killer of children under five in the country and accounts for about 20% of child deaths each year. Every year, at least 300 out of 1,000 Indonesians suffer from water-borne diseases, including cholera, dysentery, and typhoid fever, according to the Ministry of Health. World Bank's Water and Sanitation Program (WSP) in 2008 revealed that poor sanitation, including poor hygiene causes at least 120 million disease episodes and also 50,000 premature deaths annually. Significant damage to the country's future potential in terms of infant mortality and child malnutrition in low-income areas of Indonesia is greatly associated with inadequate access to safe water and basic sanitation.

== Economic impact of inadequate water supply and sanitation ==
The economic costs associated with inadequate water supply and unsanitary conditions represent formidable obstacles to the improvement of living standard. The enormous economic costs resulting from chronic ill health can contribute to poor nutrition, poor school performance, reduced productivity, and permanent disability and thus represent a drag on economic development.

One of the key findings from the Economics of Sanitation Initiative with a Water and Sanitation Program study from Southeast Asia revealed that in 2006, Indonesia lost an estimated US$6.3 billion due to poor sanitation and hygiene, equivalent to approximately 2.3% of its gross domestic product (GDP). Of the impacts evaluated, health and water resources contribute most to the overall economic losses estimated in the study. These impacts are expected to cause financial losses to populations who have to pay for health services or who pay more to access clean water supplies, or who may lose income due to poor health. Poor sanitation also contributes up to $1.2 billion per year in population welfare losses due to additional time required to access unimproved sanitation, $166 million per year in tourism losses, and $96 million in environmental losses due to loss of productive land.

Efforts to provide adequate water supply and sanitation facilities in Indonesia is also challenged by the country's population increase that led to postponement of investment in the infrastructure required for the provision of urban water and sanitation. Such challenge can lead to greater costs in the future.

== Responsibility for water and sanitation ==
=== Policy and regulation ===
Policy and regulatory responsibilities for the water and sanitation sector are shared among several ministries. While the Ministry of Health is responsible for water quality-related aspects, and to a certain extent rural services, responsibility for the urban sector is shared between the Ministry of Home Affairs and the Ministry of Public Works. The National Development Planning Agency (Bappenas) has a role in planning investments. The Ministry of Industry and Trade also has some responsibilities for the regulation of bottled water. A National Water Supply and Environmental Sanitation Working Group (Pokja AMPL) coordinates between departments and with donors and other stakeholders. The working group does not have a legal basis, nor secure funding.

==== Strategies and policies ====
Most strategies for the sector are formulated at the national level. Capacity problems, funding constraints and political factors at the sub-national level often mean national strategies are not well implemented. Furthermore, law enforcement is weak, especially for environmental sanitation. In 2009 the Ministry of Public Works and the National Development Planning Agency, Bappenas, launched a roadmap called "Acceleration of Sanitation Development in Human Settlements" (PPSP) 2010–2014. The roadmap targets 330 cities that have sanitation problems, and aims at abolishing open defecation, improving solid waste management and reducing flooding. It foresees the construction of new and expanded sewerage networks in 16 cities, covering 5 million people, and of community-based decentralized wastewater management systems in every city, covering 6 million people. The latter systems, called Sanitasi oleh Masyarakat (Sanitation by Communities), include neighborhood-level sewer systems with small wastewater treatment plants, typically using the Anaerobic Batch Reactor technology. The systems are completely operated by community-based organizations that collect user fees. According to research conducted in 2011, community-based organizations operate the systems fairly well, but are unable to undertake major maintenance such as removal of sludge from the wastewater treatment plants or repairs after natural disasters. In addition to decentralized sewer systems, the government also supports the construction of community toilets, although people prefer to have their individual toilets. Community toilets are a good alternative where individual toilets are not feasible, especially in areas subject to frequent flooding, where most residents are tenants or where there are severe space constraints and very densely populated slum areas.

In 2008 the Health Ministry launched a National Strategy for Community-Led Total Sanitation, emphasizing peer pressure and shame as drivers for rural sanitation instead of public investment. The Government's National Program for Community Empowerment (PNPM—Program Nasional Pemberdayaan Masyarakat) also has the potential to improve water and sanitation services through block grants, technical assistance and training to communities. However, similar broad programs have in the past only allocated around five per cent of funds to water and sanitation.

==== Legal framework ====
Relevant laws include Law No. 7/2004 on water resources; Law No. 22/1999 on local government; Law No.32/2004 on Regional Government; and Law No.33/2004 on Fiscal Balance between the Center and the Regions. The water resource law aims at integrated and sustainable water resources management and clarifies the responsibilities of the central government as well as provincial and district governments in terms of water resources management, such as the granting of water abstraction licenses. The local government law was a landmark in terms of decentralization in Indonesia after the fall of Suharto, making the previous rhetorical commitment to decentralization a reality by transferring all powers except certain specifically enumerated powers to local government. The fiscal balance law greatly increased the revenue base for local government. Relevant implementing regulations include Government Act No.16/2005 "on the development of the water supply system", which allows private sector participation in water supply; two decrees by the Ministry of Public Works from 2006 and 2007 to establish a National Water Board; and the Ministry of Home Affairs Decree No. 23/2006 on guidelines for water tariff setting. The latter stipulates that tariffs should fully recover costs including a rate of return of 10 percent. The decree No.47/1999 of the Ministry of Home Affairs on guidelines for evaluating the performance of water service providers (benchmarking) has now lost some of its teeth because of the subsequent decentralization policy. Decrees by the Ministry of Health as well as the Ministry of Industry and Trade regulate the quality of bottled water, as well as for water kiosks that refill large water bottles.

=== Service provision ===
==== Urban areas ====
The provision of water services in urban areas is the responsibility of PDAMs (Perusahaan Daerah Air Minum), Local Government Owned Water Utilities. There are 319 PDAMs in Indonesia. Two (Jakarta and North Sumatra) operate at provincial government level. All others operate at district government level, meaning at the level of a regency (of which there are 349) or a city (of which there are 91) (see List of regencies and cities of Indonesia) Most PDAM are very small, with less than 10,000 connections: only four per cent have more than 50,000 connections. Institutional responsibility for wastewater and sewerage is at the district government level; departmental responsibility varies between districts. Very few urban utilities provide sanitation services. Sanitation utilities are called PD-PAL or Local Government Owned Wastewater Utilities.

Some smaller PDAMs have associated themselves under Public-Private Partnerships. The first such partnership was created under the provincial government of North Sumatra in 1999, involving six PDAMs led by the utility in Tirtanadi. Another partnership of 11 PDAMs was established in Eastern Indonesia together with the Dutch water company WMD.

As of 2011, 29 localities had signed contracts with private companies to operate, and sometimes also to finance, their water infrastructure. The largest contracts are two concession contracts in Jakarta (see Water privatization in Jakarta). Most other contracts are relatively small with water sales of less than 100,000 cubic meter per day. In some cases they are management contracts without investment responsibilities, such as in Panaikang-Massakar in Sulawesi. In many cases, the private companies also partly finance infrastructure, such as a water treatment plant, under Build Operate Transfer contracts. This is the case in Medan in North Sumatra and Bandung in West Java. The private partners are mostly Indonesian companies, such as the property developer Bakrieland or the water company Acuatico, or foreign companies such as the Singapore-based engineering company Moya Asia. The central government promotes public-private partnerships in water supply through guarantees and partial subsidies. However, as of 2011 many PPP projects had to be cancelled because of the difficulty of negotiating the terms between the central, regional and local governments.

Utilities are associated in Perpamsi, the national association of water utilities created in 1972. The association has 394 member companies that serve 24% of the population of Indonesia. In 2003 Perpamsi initiated a performance benchmarking program with support from the World Bank. The data base currently contains 115 water utilities (PDAM) in Indonesia, including most of the larger ones.

==== Rural areas ====
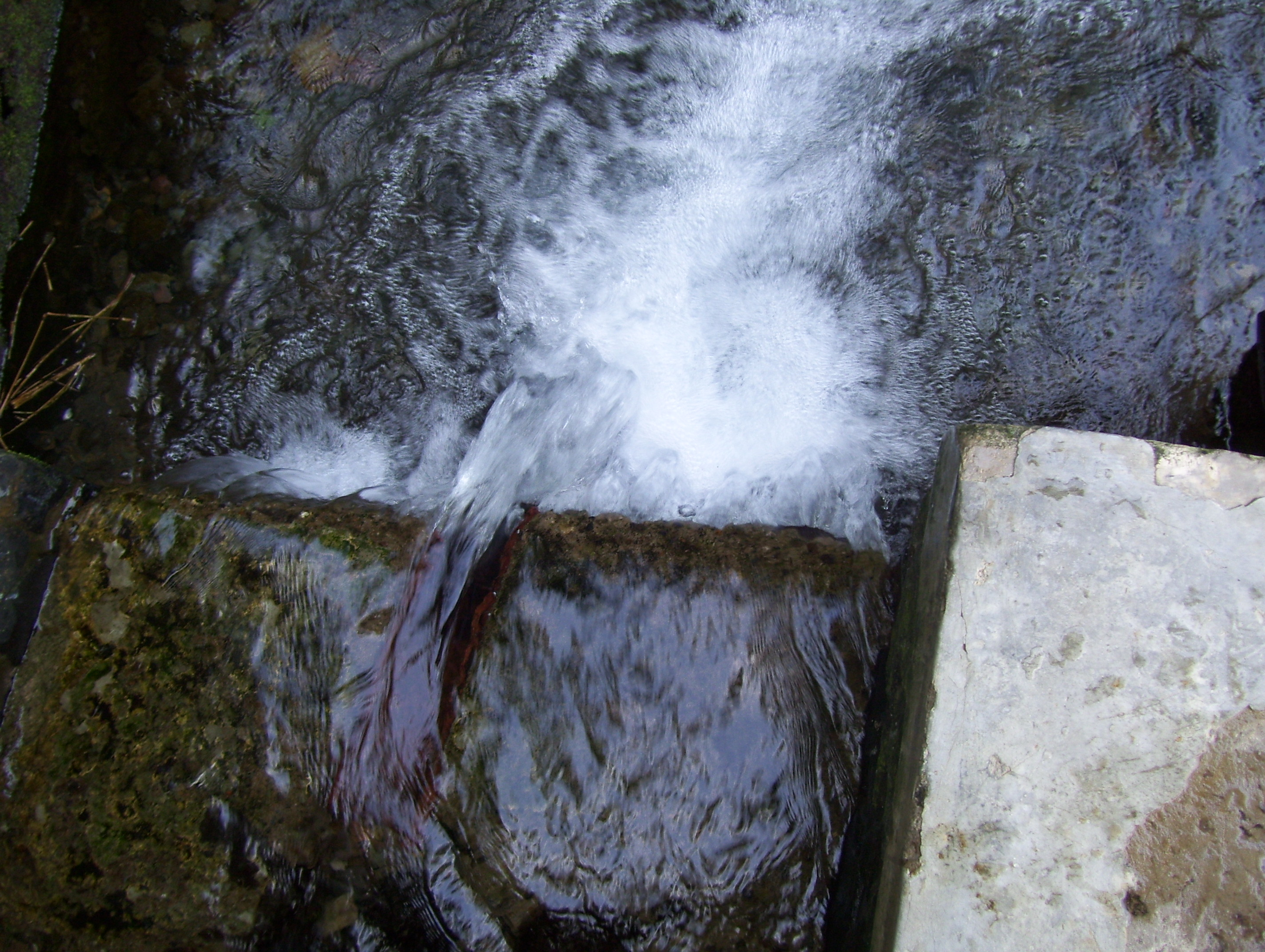
Springs, such as this one in Batu Karut in the Sukabumi regency on Java, are an important source of water in rural areas of Indonesia.

Rural Indonesia has a long history of community-managed water supply services using naturally occurring springs, rainwater and groundwater sources. However, community capacities to sustain such water systems over long periods have tended to be limited. Past rural water supply and sanitation projects have often not invested sufficiently in building community capacity to plan, implement, operate and maintain services in ways that benefit and satisfy all sections of rural societies, conditions necessary for service sustainability. Rural consumers have not consistently been offered voice and choice in decisions related to establishing and managing services and paying for them. Services have often been provided in a top-down manner by agencies external to the community, using public sector or donor funds and contractors answerable to government agencies rather than to the users of services. This has led to mismatches between what the users want and get, a lack of community ownership of rural water supply and sanitation facilities and unclear responsibilities for maintenance.

In 2003 the government endorsed, but did not adopt a National Policy for the Development of Community-Managed Water Supply and Environmental Sanitation Facilities and Services that provides a road map for sector reform, by:

- Changing the policy goals for the sector, from achieving "coverage targets" counted in terms of construction of systems facilities, to the twin goals of sustainability and effective use of water supply and sanitation services;
- Espousing strategies such as empowerment of communities to choose, co-finance, construct and manage and own their water systems;
- Requiring the use of gender-and poverty-sensitive approaches in working with and empowering user communities to ensure poverty targeting and impact on local poverty;
- Building stakeholders' understanding at all levels concerning service sustainability;
- Measuring success in terms of sustained population access to services, and effective use of those services, i.e. hygienic and health - promoting use of services by all sections of communities and improved sanitation and hygiene behaviors among various age-sex groups of the population.

The community participation and cost recovery under the new approach has led to greater sustainability of services. For example, an evaluation of a Rural Water Supply and Sanitation Project supported by the Asian Development Bank that did not yet use the new approach revealed that less than four years after project completion, only 30 per cent of the water supply facilities and 30 per cent of sanitation facilities constructed by the project were still functioning. However, according to a Ministry of Health report that reviewed the functionality of water infrastructure in five districts that had implemented the World Bank-supported WSLIC project from 2001 to 2006, the average functionality of public taps was 72 per cent. The significant differences in functionality between the ADB and WSLIC activities has been largely attributed to the participation of communities in the construction of infrastructure and the communities recovering monthly fees to cover maintenance costs of water and sanitation systems.

However, in peri-urban areas or rural areas that are increasingly absorbed in urban conglomerations, community management alone may not be an adequate arrangement. According to the World Bank, newer models of support and responsibility sharing between user communities and local governments or local private sector agencies are needed.

=== Civil society ===
Civil society groups, both local and international, play a vital role in the sector. Some are implementing water and sanitation programs in districts that have not yet received any form of government support in the sector. Despite their diversity, most are harmonised in their approach. Very few, however, work through government systems. Other civil society groups, including religious leaders in village communities, play a significant role in the success of community-based approaches. Religious leaders support community cohesion and influence and encourage clean and healthy behaviours to complement water and sanitation infrastructure.

== History and recent developments ==
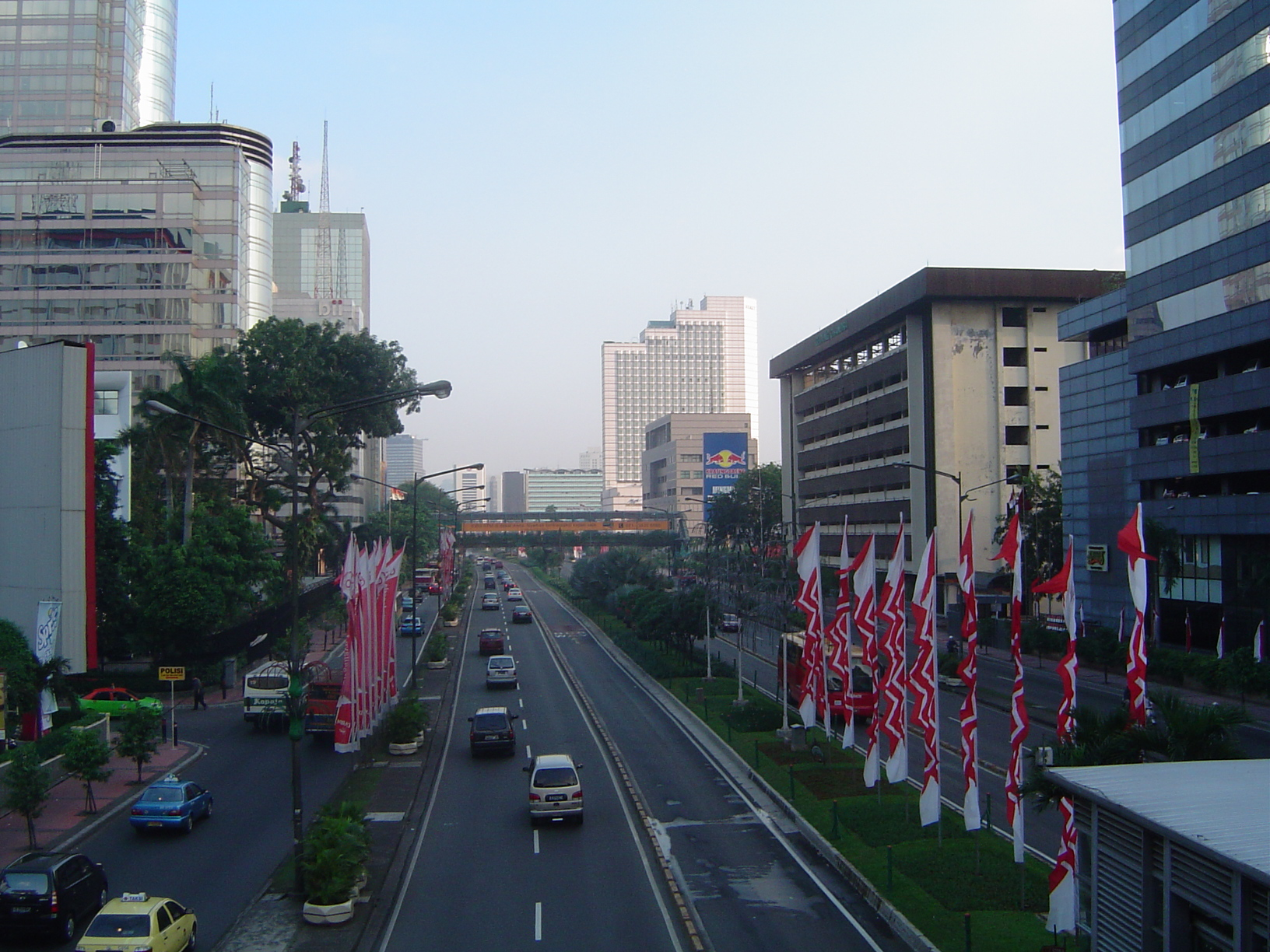
The water supply of Jakarta has been privatized since 1997 through two 25-year concession contracts.

The first water utilities in Indonesia, called PDAM after their Indonesian acronym, were set up during the colonial period at the beginning of the 20th century. Following independence in 1945 they became part of local government. In the 1970s the central government became more involved in their financing and management. In 1987 a government act nominally handed water supply back to local governments, but in reality central government remained very involved. Only after the fall of Suharto in 1998 a serious effort at decentralization was made with the local government law of 1999 that effectively handed over responsibility for water supply to local governments.

=== Jakarta privatization ===
In June 1997 two 25-year water concessions were awarded without bidding to serve the city of Jakarta beginning in February 1998. A subsidiary of The French firm Ondeo (now Suez), called Palyja, was awarded the concession for the western part of the city and a subsidiary of the British firm Thames Water International called TPJ was awarded a concession for the eastern part.

=== Policy for rural water supply and sanitation ===
In 2003 the government adopted a National Policy for the Development of Community-Managed Water Supply and Environmental Sanitation Facilities and Services that provides a clear route map for sector reform (for details see above).

== Efficiency ==
Non-revenue water (NRW) in Indonesia's best utilities stands at only 20%, while the worst quartile of utilities participating in Perpamsi's benchmarking exercise have NRW of 43%. However, NRW data is generally unreliable as many PDAMs do not have meters installed to accurately measure NRW. In terms of labor productivity, the best performing utilities have a staff ratio of 4 per 1000 connections, while utilities in the worst quartile have more than 9 staff per 1000 connections. Labor productivity for water utilities is considered to be at acceptable levels if it is below 5 per 1000 connections. In Jakarta the level of non-revenue water was 51% in 2001, one of the highest levels in Indonesia. However, in terms of labor productivity the two utilities in Jakarta fare relatively well with only 5.3 employees per 1000 connections.

== Cost recovery and tariffs ==
The Ministry of Home Affairs Decree No. 23/2006 sets out a policy of full cost recovery through tariff revenues for water utilities. The decree prescribes an increasing-block water tariff with a first subsidized tariff block for a consumption of up to 10 cubic meters per household, and a break-even tariff for higher consumption. Commercial and industrial users can be charged higher tariffs with higher blocks at the full-cost tariff. However, in reality, few utilities recover their costs. According to a 2005 study by the Department of Public Works, most PDAMs faced financial problems. Only about a third increased tariffs between 1998 and 2005. One third of utilities had foreign debt, whose value in local currency increased substantially due to the devaluation of the rupeeh in the 1998 financial crisis. Many PDAMs defaulted on loans they had received from the Ministry of Finance. As of 2009 renegotiation of these loans (principal, interest and penalties) was still underway, thus cutting off the utilities from new government loans.

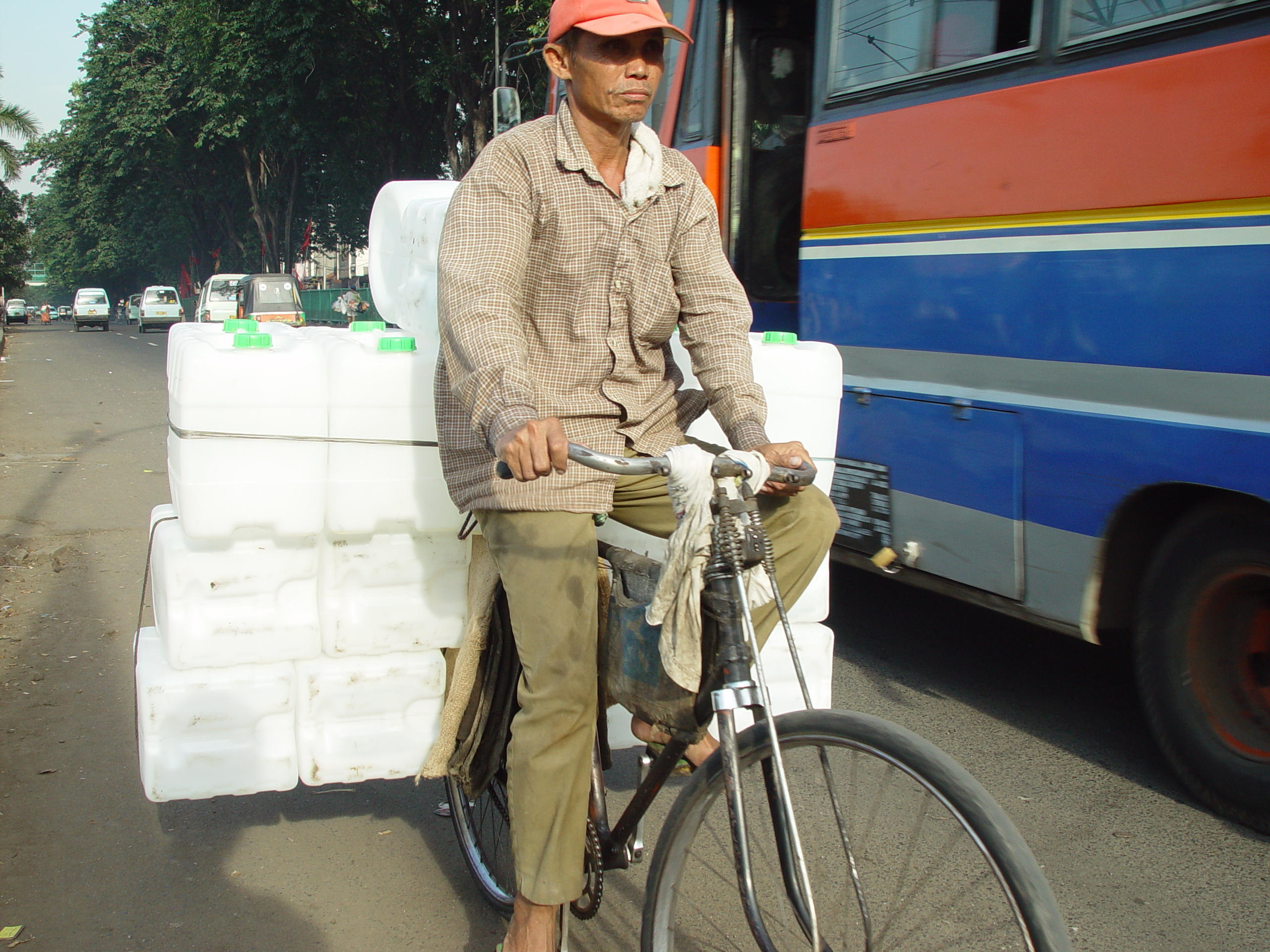
Water sold by vendors is much more expensive than piped water. Sometimes water is transported by a bike.

According to the Asian Development Bank, in Jakarta the average tariff in 2001 (average of residential and commercial users) was US$0.29/m^{3}, compared to production costs estimated at only US$0.11/m^{3}. 98% of revenues billed were collected. According to these figures, at least the Jakarta utility managed to recover its costs. Since then tariffs have been increased several times and, according to the International Benchmarking Network for Water and Sanitation Utilities, reached US$0.77/m^{3}.

As in many other countries, those not connected to water supply networks pay the most for water. A survey in North Jakarta found the price of water in the early 1990s was $2.62/m^{3} for vendor customers, $1.26/m^{3} for standpipe customers, $1.08/m^{3} for household resales customers, and only $0.18/m^{3} for connected households.

== Investment and financing ==
The water and sanitation sector is not given a high priority at the national or sub-national level, partly because of competing priorities from other sectors such as health and education. Few local governments use their own resources to implement water and sanitation activities and when given funding through open-menu infrastructure programs, local governments and communities rarely choose water and sanitation as the main activity. Most funding for the sector comes from the national level and the level of sub-national funding is often hidden as it occurs in several government departments. Funding estimates for the sector in 2008 were around one to two per cent of local government budgets.

=== Public investment ===
Total infrastructure spending in Indonesia was Rp 55 trillion in 2005 (US$5.7 billion). These expenditures were financed mainly by the local (Rp 23 trillion) and central government (also Rp 23 trillion), followed by the provincial government (Rp 9 trillion). Infrastructure investment stood at 10% of total government expenditures, as shown in the table below:

	Central	Province	District	Total
Infrastructure	23	9	23	55
Total	357	38	141	536
Share of infrastructure	6.4%	23.7%	16.3%	10.3%

Source: Calculations based on [World Bank Indonesia Public Finance Data Page]. All figures are in current trillion Rupiah for 2005.

While it is not entirely clear how much of this sum has been invested in water supply and sanitation, the ADB estimates that only US$124m per year (average of 2004–2005) from the regular national budget were allocated to water supply and sanitation.

Since decentralization in the year 2001, local governments have typically invested less than 2% of their annual budgets on water supply, even less on sanitation and almost nothing on improving hygiene practices. Assuming that 2% of local government (provincial and district) budgets are spent on water and sanitation, local government investments in water and sanitation were Rp 3.6 trillion or US$375m or about three times higher than the US$124m financed through the central budget. Total investments thus can be very tentatively estimated at US$500m, or slightly more than what has been estimated by one source as the required investments to meet the MDGs, or US$450 million per year At about US$2 per capita and year these investments still remain far lower than investments in water and sanitation in other middle-income countries.

The economic crisis of the late 1990s had severely curtailed investment in infrastructure. Central government spending on development dropped from US$14 billion in 1994 to US$5 billion in 2002, within which the share of infrastructure spending further declined from 57% to 30% over the same period. Moreover, according to the World Bank, poor institutional and regulatory frameworks and rampant corruption in the infrastructure sector, which were prevalent even before the crisis, continued without serious sector reform efforts by the government until today.

=== Utility financing ===
Loan financing to PDAMs faces numerous challenges. For example, the Ministry of Finance requires its loans to be channeled through regional governments whose legislatures have to pledge future central government transfers as collateral. Since regional legislatures are reluctant to do so, central government lending to utilities is not likely to re-emerge even after the issue of old debt would be settled. Two efforts at promoting the issuing of corporate bonds by creditworthy utilities, one supported by partial guarantees by USAID and the other by KfW, have failed "because of the risk-averse culture which is so pervasive in Indonesian central and regional governments", according to a USAID report. Under a 2009 Presidential decree, however, state banks can provide partial credit guarantees of 70% of loans to creditworthy PDAMs plus an interest subsidy. As for direct lending by the Ministry of Finance, regional governments have to provide partial guarantees for these loans, which they are reluctant to provide.

Thus PDAMs are likely to be limited in their access to finance largely to grants, which are scarce. In 2009 there were three primary sources of national government grant funding for water supply:

- Matching grants (hibah) to regional governments. Water supply is expected to receive Rp 3 trillion of hibah from the national budget between 2010 and 2014, complemented by funds from external donors.
- A Special Allocations Fund (DAK), which accounted for 2.4% of the national budget in 2009, of which about 5% were directed towards the water supply sector, especially village community-based systems.
- Grants by the Ministry of Public Works for raw water supply and treatment.

=== Microfinance ===
Bank Negara Indonesia provides small loans to community-based organizations (CBOs) engaged in water supply in Java. The pilot project is part of a national program called Kredit Usaha Rakyat that provides loans for community and small scale enterprises. The World Bank's Water and Sanitation Program in collaboration with the AusAID-funded Indonesia Infrastructure Initiative (INDII), the Ministry of Public Works, and Directorate of Public Private Partnership Development of the National Development Planning Agency provide technical assistance to the CBOs.

== External cooperation ==
External support to the water and sanitation sector in Indonesia is provided through multilateral (World Bank, Asian Development Bank and UN) as well as bilateral cooperation with individual countries. Most external partners have focused their cooperation on rural areas, or work exclusively there. Most of the support for urban areas comes from Japan, the Netherlands and the United States.

=== Multilateral cooperation ===
The Community Water Services and Health Project by the Asian Development Bank, approved in 2005, aimed at providing clean water and sanitation facilities to about 1,500 communities of rural Indonesia, including tsunami-affected areas. The Directorate General of Communicable Disease Control and Environmental Health of the Ministry of Health is the executing agency of the project.

UNICEF supports the Indonesian government in developing and implementing strategies that improve drinking water and sanitation conditions across the country. UNICEF also assists the government in improving relevant planning mechanisms, monitoring systems and databases.

The World Bank's Third Water Supply and Sanitation for Low Income Communities Project, approved in 2006, aims to increase the number of low-income rural and peri-urban populations accessing improved water and sanitation facilities and practicing improved hygiene behaviors. The project supports community driven development (CDD) planning and management of water, sanitation and hygiene improvement programs, builds stakeholder commitment and aims to expand the capacity of central, provincial and district government agencies. It provides participating communities with a menu of technical options for rural water supply and public sanitation infrastructure. The project is implemented by the Ministry of Health.

The World Bank's Water and Sanitation Program (WSP) focuses particularly on knowledge management and strategy development in sanitation. Between 2006 and 2010 WSP, with funding from Sweden and the Netherlands, generated increased political commitment for sanitation and increased the national government's capacity for sanitation planning through the "Indonesia Sanitation Sector Development Program" (ISSDP). This led to a coherent policy framework for urban sanitation, under which substantial investments are being undertaken from 2010 onwards.

=== Bilateral cooperation ===
- Australia has supported efforts to improve rural water supply and sanitation in Indonesia, particularly Eastern Indonesia, for almost 30 years. AusAID's support is in the form of grants for technical assistance to the Water Supply and Sanitation Policy Formulation and Action Planning Project (WASPOL) of the World Bank's Water and Sanitation Program (WSP), as well as to the Second Water and Sanitation for Low-Income Communities program (WSLIC2), also funded mainly by the World Bank. A 2009 evaluation by the Australian government concluded that Australian aid to the water sector "has been strategic, flexible and appropriate" and has assisted in "providing sustainable piped-water supply to some 4.6 million people and has dramatically improved sector coordination at national and sub national levels." The evaluation also noted that there has been much less focus on sanitation, although the Government has begun to replicate the innovative Community-Led Total Sanitation approach in an attempt to achieve open defecation free (ODF) communities. The report also noted that a "national working group established through WASPOLA has strengthened government capacity in research, communications, marketing and public relations", but that these approaches are less well integrated at the sub-national level. It also notes that "despite its relatively low funding for this sector compared to that of some other donors and multilateral agencies, Australia is seen as a lead donor." It also notes that AusAID-supported technical assistance has "relied heavily on external consultants and have not built enough technical capacity into government to ensure sustainability." Female participation at the local level was mandatory in the project, but once project handover occurred women's participation often dropped. The community-managed approach "enhanced transparency and accountability", but districts are not using this model in their own projects due to lack of capacity and political will.
- CARE Canada and the Canadian International Development Agency (CIDA) support the CARE-Sulawesi Rural Community Development Project (SRCD). CARE uses the "community management approach", by which communities are heavily involved right from the very beginning, from the design through construction, implementation, operation and maintenance. The approach works by establishing a village water committee and a series of sub-committees: for example, sanitation, construction and finance. The village itself decides how it will raise the amount of money needed for its contribution to the project. This is usually done by monthly levy whereby each family contributes a small amount of money over the course of four to six months. The village construction committee also organizes the labour to install the system. All the labour is done manually without the use of heavy machinery, which means a low environmental impact and lower cost. With water close at hand, most households are also building their own simple latrines.
- (Japan) In November 1994, JBIC provided a loan for the "Denpasar Sewerage Development Project" (Phase I, October 2004-December 2008) supporting the construction of sewer pipes, pump stations, and wastewater treatment facilities in districts where the urgency for development of a sewerage system was particularly high (the Denpasar, Sanur, Legian and Seminyak districts, covering 1,145 ha). JBIC also provided indirect support in 2007 for the establishment of a model for the provision of a sewerage service by local government. The project covers 1,145 ha of urgently required areas of sewerage system identified in the Denpasar Sewerage Development Master Plan (DSDMP) prepared by JICA in 1993. The government of Bali desired to establish a new organization for management and operation of the sewerage system including wastewater treatment plant. And then, governor of Bali province, Mayor of Denpasar and Regent of Badung signed joint agreement regarding the establishment of operation body named Wastewater Management Body (UPT PAL). However, the operation body was later decided to be established as Public Service Organization of Wastewater Management (BLUPAL) instead of BPAL based on the Government regulation on financial management of public service agency (BLU) promulgated in 2005. And finally, BLUPAL was established in December 2006. Though DSDP-I completed the construction in August 2008, some urgently required areas of sewerage development in Denpasar and Kuta identified in the Master Plan were not covered by DSDP-I. Some communities in Kuta and Sanur also strongly requested to develop sewerage system immediately. Furthermore, BLUPAL intended to start tariff collection by the end of 2009, since revenue from service areas of the Project would contribute to improve BLUPAL's financial situation. In response to the above conditions, JICA conducted Special Assistance for Project Implementation (SAPI) to start sewerage system expansion works of DSDP-II and to suggest and support the tariff system and financial plan of BLUPAL.
- (Netherlands) The public Dutch water company Water Supply Company Drenthe (WMD) and Dutch development aid support various water companies in eastern Indonesia. Joint venture contracts have been concluded with four companies (Ambon, Bacau (Maluku), Biak, Sorong (Irian Jaya/Papua)). Negotiations are going on with seven other companies in North Sulawesi, Maluku and Papua. The WMD has reserved 3.4 million euros for the project.
- (United States) Since early 2005 USAID has provided technical assistance to water utilities (PDAMs) in Java and Sumatra on issues related to full cost recovery tariffs and improved technical operation, with the objective of improving their creditworthiness and ability to borrow to meet network expansion needs. USAID is also looking at ways to use its partial credit guarantee mechanism to further increase local water utilities' access to commercial financing.

== See also ==
- Environmental issues in Indonesia
