= Rawinala =

Rawinala is a foundation that provides education and care for people with MDVI (Multiple Disabilities and Visual Impairment) in Indonesia. Rawinala has 5 main Programs: Education, Dormitories and Orphanage, Sheltered Workshop, Community Based Rehabilitation and Training Center.

== History ==
Rawinala was founded in 1973 by a group of GKJ church community. Currently Rawinala has over 60 students, from ages 2 to 20. Rawinala is also the home of 10 Vulnarable Adults with MDVI. The term "Rawinala" comes from ancient Javanese language which means "Light of the Heart".

== Vision ==
"To be the pre-eminent center of comprehensive services for children and adults with multiple disabilities and visual Impairment"

== Mission ==
Rawinala aims to provide excellent education, care and development opportunity for people with Multiple Disabilities and Visual Impairment in Indonesia, by strengthening our professionalism in education, infrastructure and network.

== Motto ==
Give your hand and heart to serve
