= Healthcare in Indonesia =

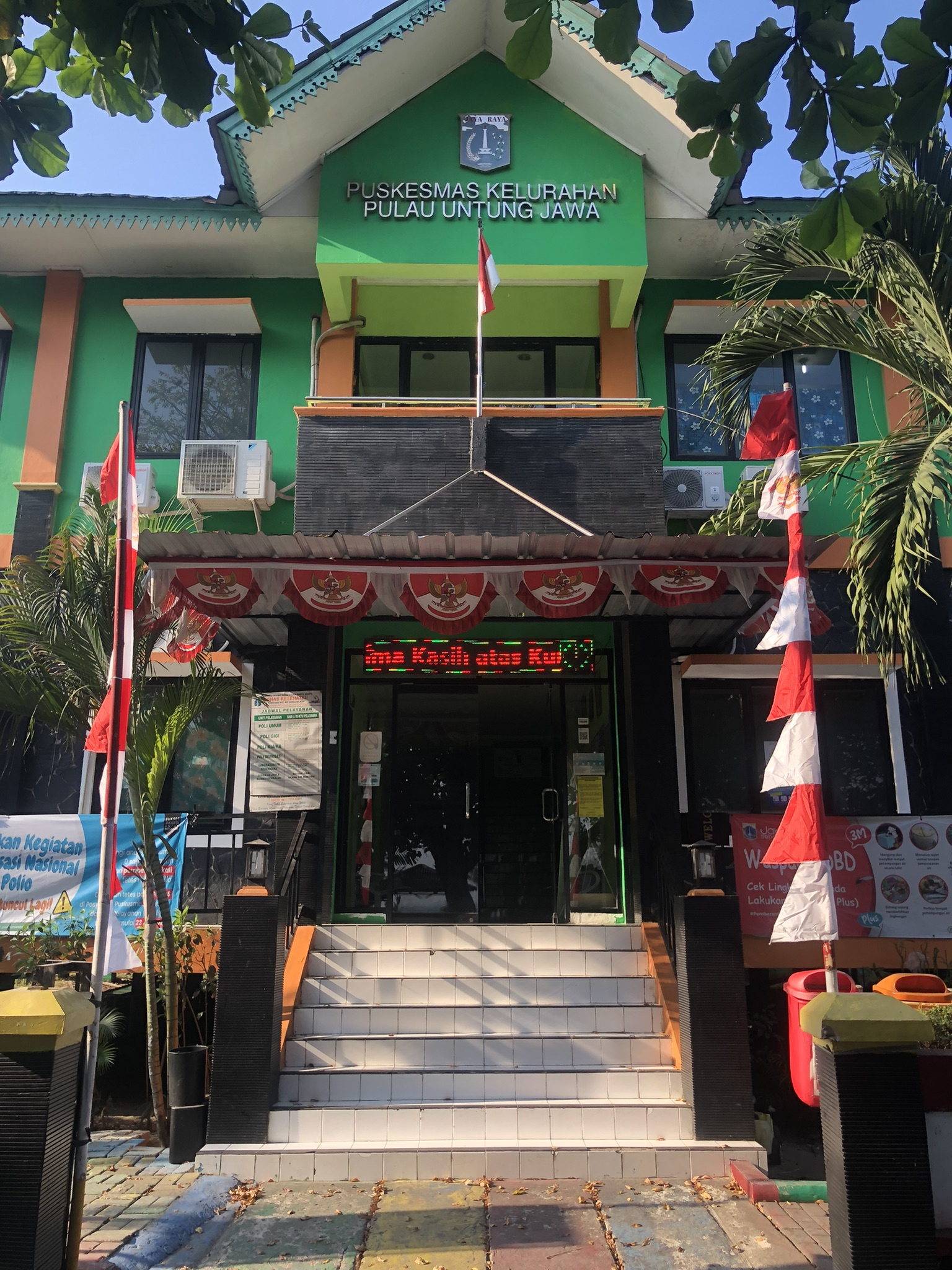
Untung Jawa Island health center (Puskesmas)

Government expenditure on healthcare was about 3.1% of its total gross domestic product in 2018.

== Provision ==
As of 2019, there are 2,813 hospitals in Indonesia, 63.5% of which are run by private organisations. In 2012, according to data from the Ministry of Health of Indonesia, there were 2,454 hospitals around the country, with a total of 305,242 beds, a figure of 0.9 bed per 1,000 inhabitants. Most hospitals are in urban areas. According to the 2012 World Bank data, there are 0.2 physicians per 1,000 people, with 1.2 nurses and midwives per 1,000 people in Indonesia. Out of all the 2,454 hospitals in Indonesia, 20 have been accredited by Joint Commission International (JCI) as of 2015. In addition, there are 9,718 government-financed Puskesmas (Health Community Centre) listed by the Ministry of Health of Indonesia, which provide comprehensive healthcare and vaccination for the population in the sub-district level. Both traditional and modern health practices are employed.

Indonesia's community health system is organised in three tiers: on top of the chart is Community Health Centre (Puskesmas), followed by Health Sub-Centres on the second level, and Village-Level Integrated Posts at the third level.

== Universal health coverage ==
Life expectancy development in Indonesia

In 2010, an estimated 56% of Indonesians, mainly state employees, low-income earners, and those with private coverage had some form of health insurance. The rate was expected to reach 100% by 2019, following the implementation of a system of universal social health insurance coverage that was launched in 2014. As of 2020, an estimated 83% of the population (223 million people) were covered by the scheme. The aim was to grant free services for all hospitalisations in basic (class-3) hospital beds.

Healthcare provision in Indonesia has traditionally been fragmented, with private insurance being provided for those who can afford it alongside basic public coverage for the most impoverished in society and NGOs working in specialised areas providing services to those not covered by public or private schemes. In January 2014, the government launched Jaminan Kesehatan Nasional (JKN, "National Health Insurance"), a scheme to implement universal health care. It was expected that spending on healthcare would increase by 12% a year and reach US$46 billion a year by 2019.

Under JKN, all Indonesians will receive coverage for a range of treatments via health services from public providers as well as those private organisations that have opted to join the scheme. The formally employed pay a premium worth 5% of their salary, with 1% being paid by the employee and 4% being paid by their employer. Informal workers and the self-employed pay a fixed monthly premium of between 25,500 and 59,500 IDR (£1.34-£3.12). However, the scheme has been criticised for being over-ambitious, a lack of competency in administration, and a failure to address the need for improving healthcare infrastructure in remote areas. An official for the programme's administering organisation, the social security agency BPJS Kesehatan, has stated that JKN exceeded its target for enrolling members in its first year (registering 133.4 million members compared to a target of 121.6 million) and that, according to an independent survey, the customer satisfaction rate was 81%, awareness of JKN was 95%, and that complaints had been resolved within one and a half days on average. JKN is expected to be implemented in stages. When the initial stages came into effect in January 2014, 48% of the country's population became covered. As of April 2018, the scheme had 195 million enrollees (75% of the population). It is expected that the entire population will be covered in 2019.

In 2016, the BPJS program had a deficit of more than IDR six trillion. However, the deficit ballooned to 32 trillion in only three years. In response, the government issued a policy that increases the monthly premium for access by 80 to 100%. Some saw the move as placing a burden on the low- and middle-income citizens.

== Mental health ==
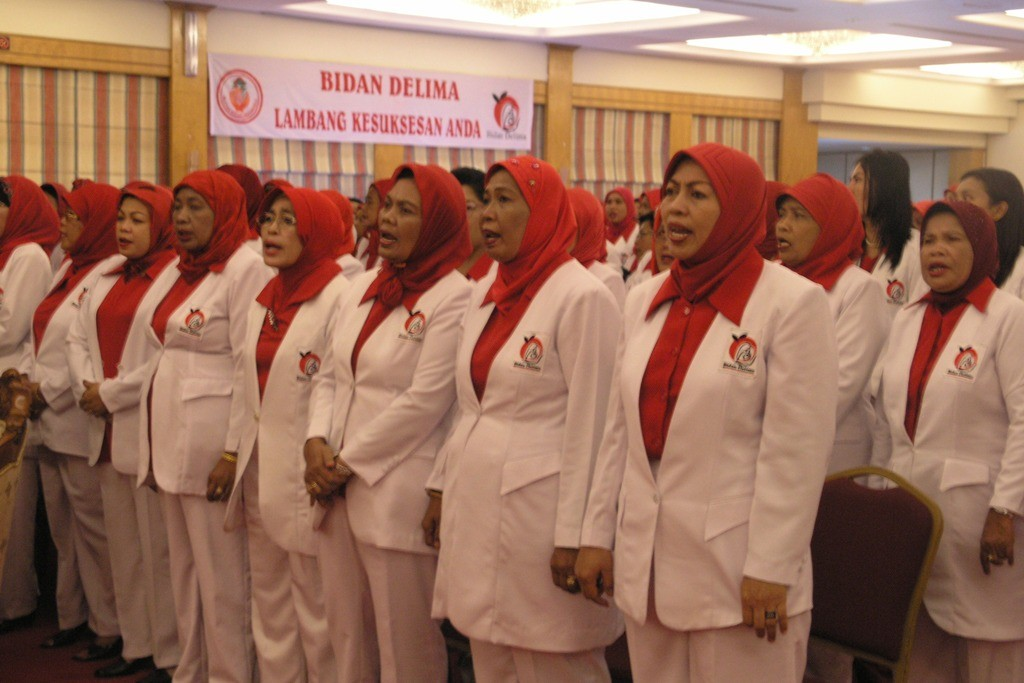
Newly certified midwives in South Sulawesi, Indonesia.

Eleven per cent of the country's population suffers from mental disorders, with over 19 million of the people of age 15 or older. The neuropsychiatric disorders in Indonesia are estimated to contribute to 10.7% of the burden disease. There are definitely gaps in the mental health department that cannot be overlooked, with many of them are representative of the mental health gaps in Southeast Asia as a whole. The mental health policy in Indonesia was most recently revised in 2001. Since then, the nation has gone through enormous changes in all aspects as a country. Indonesia's economy has been steadily growing in the past decade. Health wise, Indonesia has suffered numerous H5N1 outbreaks, with the highest number of recorded human cases of this virus in the world. The nation was severely affected by the tsunami tragedy in 2004. There are still many factors that have altered Indonesians' lives, ultimately affecting the mental health status of the people significantly since 2001, calling for a more updated mental health policy.

There is a tiny amount of funding dedicated to mental health. The total health expenditure is 2.36%, and less than 1% of that goes towards mental health. Indonesia's mental health legislation has the same issues mentioned above that Southeast Asia faces as a region. The law is far from what can be considered complete and fair, and the articles included are not well practised and reinforced. In 1966, Indonesia was well ahead of other countries in the region by having a mental health law separated from general health laws, providing potentials for expansion of the mental health system. However, the law was repealed in 1993 and integrated into general health laws. Mental health now only occupies four articles in the current health law. The articles are too broad, causing difficulties of application and implementation. Article 26 states that almost anybody can request treatment and hospitalisation for persons with a mental disorder, yet has no mention of the person's consent. By doing so, Article 26 creates an impression that mentally ill individuals are generally considered dangerous to the community because they need to be forced into treatment. This situation goes along with the negative stigmas associated with mental disorders. Also, Article 27 states that the government would provide a presidential decree for regulations and management of mental health, yet nothing has been done.

There are also issues with accessibility and quality of mental health care. Official in-service training is not widely provided to primary care professionals. WHO reports in 2011 that between 2006 and 2011, the majority of primary care doctors and nurses have not received such training. There is also only one mental health hospital per five million people and one psychiatrist working in the mental health sector in ten million people. In addition to the unbalanced number of psychiatrists among the population, the psychiatrists are also not well distributed in the country. Up until 2011, there were no psychiatrists in rural areas, while half of them are concentrated in the capital city of Jakarta, and the rest in Yogyakarta, and the second-largest city, Surabaya. This situation creates a barrier for mental health patients seeking official help.

== See also ==
- Health in Indonesia
