= BPJS Kesehatan =

National universal healthcare provider in Indonesia

- Native name: Badan Penyelenggara Jaminan Sosial Kesehatan
- Type: Public agency
- Industry: Health insurance
- Founded: July 15, 1968; 58 years ago (original form); January 1, 2014 (as BPJS Kesehatan)
- Headquarters: Jl. Letjen Suprapto Kav. 20 No. 14, Cempaka Putih, Central Jakarta, Jakarta, Indonesia
- Revenue: Rp 79.25 (2021)
- Net income: Rp 3,749.92 (2021)
- Total assets: Rp 216.48 (2021)
- Website: www.bpjs-kesehatan.go.id

Badan Penyelenggara Jaminan Sosial Kesehatan (BPJS Kesehatan, lit. 'Social Security Agency on Health') is a social security agency of Indonesia aimed at providing universal health care to its citizens. BPJS Kesehatan is one of two social security agencies in the country alongside BPJS Ketenagakerjaan.

In January 2014, the Indonesian government launched a universal health care system called the Jaminan Kesehatan Nasional (JKN, "National Health Insurance"). Covering around 250 million people, it is the world's most extensive insurance system. As part of the JKN, on 1 January 2014, PT Askes (Persero) was changed from a state-owned company into BPJS Kesehatan, a public agency, which becomes the provider of JKN. It is expected that the entire population will be covered in 2019.

In 2016, the BPJS program had a deficit of more than six trillion IDR. However, the deficit ballooned to 32 trillion in only three years. In response, the government issued a policy that increases the monthly premium for access by 80% to 100%. Some people saw the move as placing a burden on low to middle-income citizens.

Every Indonesian citizen and foreigner who has worked in Indonesia for at least six months must become a member of the program in accordance with Article 14 of the BPJS Regulation.

== Premiums ==
Premiums have three different categories based on the level of service. Premiums are paid monthly and as of 1 January 2021 are the following:

Rates by class
Class	2019	2020	2021
First	80,000 IDR	150,000 IDR	150,000 IDR
Second	51,000 IDR	100,000 IDR	100,000 IDR
Third	25,500 IDR	25,500 IDR	35,500 IDR

== Membership ==
1. Workers with Salary
2. Non-Receiving Wage Worker (PBPU) and Non-Workers (BP)
3. Beneficiaries of Health Insurance Contribution Assistance (PBI JK)

Beneficiaries of Health Insurance Contribution Assistance (PBI JK) are Participants who are classified as poor and disadvantaged people whose contributions are paid by the Government. Additionally, they will be automated in class 3.

Recipients of Health Insurance Contribution Assistance must meet the following requirements:

a. Indonesian Citizen
b. Have a registered NIK at Dukcapil
c. Registered in Integrated Social Welfare Data

== See also ==
- Healthcare in Indonesia
