= List of Sigma Pi members =

Following is a list of notable members of Sigma Pi.

== Founders ==
- Rolin Roscoe James – (October 16, 1879 – February 4, 1953) Graduated from Vincennes University in 1899 before earning his A.B. degree from Earlham College in 1902. Studied law at Harvard Law School before becoming an attorney.
- James Thompson Kingsbury – (January 8, 1877 to October 1, 1950) Graduated from Vincennes University in 1897 and received his law degree from the University of Illinois in 1902. Practiced law in Bisbee, Arizona.
- William Raper Kennedy – (November 22, 1877 – December 5, 1944) Graduated from Vincennes University in 1897 and served in the Spanish–American War. Was in almost continuous military service for the rest of his life, rising from private to lieutenant colonel. He was a faculty member at Culver Military Academy from 1905 to 1944.
- George Martin Patterson – (November 7, 1877 – April 7, 1960) Graduated from Vincennes University in 1897. Became the Deputy Recorder for Knox County, Indiana for six years before becoming a farmer.

== Arts and entertainment ==
Name	Original chapter	Notability	Ref.
Keith Andes	Kappa, Temple University	Actor on stage, film, TV, and radio from 1932 to 1980.	
Bobby Burgess	Beta-Omicron, California State University, Long Beach	Actor and Dancer on the TV-shows Mickey Mouse Club (the original series), The Lawrence Welk Show, and The Donna Reed Show.	
Ronald Davidson	Iota, University of California, Berkeley	Screenwriter, Director, and Producer from 1937 to 1966.	
Paschal English	Alpha-Phi, University of Georgia	Judge in the Georgia state courts and contestant on the fourth season of the TV show Survivor.	
Ray Evans	Gamma, Ohio State University	Nationally distributed editorial cartoonist from 1910 to 1954.	
Dudley Fisher	Gamma, Ohio State University	Syndicated newspaper cartoonist, best known for his character Myrtle, who was featured in his strip Right Around Home, which started in 1937.	
Daniel Gerson	Mu, Cornell University	Screenwriter for TV and animated films from 1996 to 2015. He co-wrote the screenplay for Big Hero 6 which won an Academy Award for Best Animated Feature in 2014.	
Lewis Grizzard	Alpha-Phi, University of Georgia	Syndicated columnist for the Atlanta Journal-Constitution, author, and humorist.	
Rich Herrera	Zeta-Kappa, California State University Bakersfield	Sports Radio personality.	
Tracy Lawrence	Epsilon-Kappa, Southern Arkansas University	Country music star.	
Sebastian Maniscalco	Beta-Sigma, Northern Illinois University	Comedian and actor	
William Keepers Maxwell Jr.	Phi, University of Illinois	Fiction editor for The New Yorker magazine from 1936 to 1975. Also, an award-winning novelist and short story writer. Elected president of the National Institute of Arts and Letters in 1968.	
John Milhiser	Eta-Gamma, Hofstra University	Comedian and cast member on Saturday Night Live during the 2013-2014 season.	
Kevin Morris	Mu, Cornell University	Writer, producer, and agent.	
Rick Rockwell	Theta, Pennsylvania State University	Comedian and speaker most known for being the millionaire on the TV show Who Wants to Marry a Millionaire.	
Donald C. Simmons, Jr.	Beta-Mu, University of Mississippi	Author, college professor, coach, and minister.	
Trevor White	Mu, Cornell University	Film producer, director, and writer.	

== Business ==
Name	Original chapter	Notability	Ref.
Thomas Breitling	Epsilon-Chi, University of San Diego	Co-founder of Travelscape, casino executive, co-founder of Ultimate Poker and Ultimate Casino.	
Mike Dee	Nu, Franklin & Marshall College	CEO of the Miami Dolphins from 2009 to 2013 and the San Diego Padres from 2013 to 2016.	
George T. Felbeck	Phi, University of Illinois	President of Union Carbide from 1944 to 1962.	
Lorenzo Fertitta	Epsilon-Chi, University of San Diego	Casino executive and owner of Ultimate Fighting Championship.	
Herman Fisher	Theta, Pennsylvania State University	Co-founder of Fisher-Price.	
Barry Weiss	Mu, Cornell University	Music Executive best known as an important force in the careers of Britney Spears, Backstreet Boys, 'N Sync, among numerous others	
John Zimmer	Mu, Cornell University	Founder of Zimride and Lyft	

== Education ==
Name	Original chapter	Notability	Ref.
Charles E. Bayless	Gamma-Xi, West Virginia University Institute of Technology	President of West Virginia Tech from 2005 to 2008 and former Regional Vice President for West Virginia University.	
Isaac K. Beckes	Alpha, Vincennes University	President of Vincennes University from 1950 to 1980.	
Warren E. Bow	Phi, University of Illinois	Second President of Wayne State University from 1942 to 1945.	
J. Marvin Brown	Pi, University of Utah	Linguist notable for originating the Automatic Language Growth (ALG) approach to language teaching.	
Lester J. Cappon	Tau, University of Wisconsin	History professor, documentary editor, and archivist for Colonial Williamsburg.	
William George Carr	Upsilon, UCLA	Executive Secretary for the National Education Association from 1952 to 1967. General Secretary and President of the World Confederation of Organizations of the Teaching Profession from 1946 to 1972.	
Garfield V. Cox	Alpha-Theta, Beloit College	Dean of the Booth School of Business at the University of Chicago from 1942 to 1952. One of the authors of the 1933 Chicago plan on banking reforms and one of the first to study the performance of experts to novices in forecasting stock prices.	
Emile B. De Sauzé	Delta, University of Pennsylvania and Kappa, Temple University	Language educator credited with developing the conversational method of learning a language.	
Lacey Eastburn	Beta-Iota, Northern Arizona University	Tenth President of Northern Arizona University from 1947 to 1957.	
William Hazell, Jr.	Alpha-Mu, New Jersey Institute of Technology	Fifth President of the New Jersey Institute of Technology from 1970 to 1975.	
Robert Livingston Johnson	Kappa, Temple University	Third President of Temple University from 1941 to 1959. Helped to develop the United States Information Agency in 1953. President of the National Civil Service League in the 1930s.	
Herbert E. Longenecker	Theta, Pennsylvania State University	Eleventh President of Tulane University from 1960 to 1975.	
Ralph Munn	Gamma, Ohio State University	Eminent figure in the field of American and international library and information science. Recognized by the journal American Libraries as one of "100 of the most important leaders we had in the 20th century".	
Thomas J. Parmley	Pi, University of Utah	Physics professor at the University of Utah from 1930 to 1980.	
Max Rafferty	Upsilon, UCLA	22nd California Superintendent of Public Instruction from 1963 to 1971. Author of several books on educational philosophy, including Practice and Trends in School Administration (1961), Suffer, Little Children (1962), What They Are Doing to Your Children (1964), and Max Rafferty on Education (1968). His newspaper column, "Dr. Max Rafferty", was syndicated nationally.	
George D. Stoddard	Theta, Pennsylvania State University	Tenth President of the University of Illinois (1946-1953) and President of the University of the State of New York (1942-1946). Attendee at the first UNESCO meeting and advisor to General Douglas MacAurthur on rebuilding the Japanese educational system.	
Richard J. Stonesifer	Nu, Franklin & Marshall College	Fifth President of Monmouth University from 1971 to 1979.	
Robert Van Houten	Alpha-Mu, New Jersey Institute of Technology	Fourth President of the New Jersey Institute of Technology from 1947 to 1970.	
J. Lawrence Walkup	Beta-Iota, Northern Arizona University	Eleventh President of Northern Arizona University from 1957 to 1979.	
John Philip Wernette	Upsilon, UCLA	Eighth President of the University of New Mexico from 1945 to 1948.	

== Government and law ==
=== National ===
==== Legislators ====
Name	Original chapter	Notability	Ref.
Michael Bilirakis	Chi, University of Pittsburgh	Member of the United States House of Representatives from January 3, 1983 to January 3, 2007.	
Frank T. Bow	Zeta, Ohio Northern University	Member of the United States House of Representatives from January 3, 1951 to November 13, 1972.	
Chris Collins	Rho, North Carolina State University	Member of the United States House of Representatives since 2013. County Executive of Erie County, New York from 2007 to 2011.	
Bill Harsha	Lambda, Kenyon College	Member of the United States House of Representatives from January 3, 1961 to January 3, 1981.	
David W. Hopkins	Xi, University of Iowa	Member of the United States House of Representatives from 1928 to 1932.	
Edwin L. Mechem	Beta-Xi, New Mexico State University	Three term Governor of the State of New Mexico, U.S. Senator from 1962 to 1964, and U.S. Federal Judge from 1970 to 1982.	
Carlton Mobley	Alpha-Epsilon, Mercer University	One of the ten youngest members ever of the U.S. House of Representatives when he was elected in 1932. Lt. Commander in the U.S. Navy during World War II. Georgia Supreme Court Justice from 1954 to 1974.	
John T. Myers	Beta-Gamma, Eastern Illinois University	Member of the U.S. House of Representatives from 1967 to 1997.	
William I. Troutman	Nu, Franklin & Marshall College	Member of the US House of Representatives from 1942 to 1945. Last representative to serve Pennsylvania's at-large congressional district. Member of the Pennsylvania State Senate.	

==== Judges ====
Name	Original chapter	Notability	Ref.
Morris S. Arnold	Alpha-Sigma, University of Arkansas	U.S. Federal Judge on the U.S. Court of Appeals Eighth Circuit from 1992 to 2006. Judge on the United States Foreign Intelligence Surveillance Court of Review from 2008 to 2013.	
Andrew J. Guilford	Upsilon, University of California, Los Angeles	United States district judge for the Central District of California since 2006.	
Girard Edward Kalbfleisch	Zeta, Ohio Northern University	U.S. Federal Judge on the United States District Court for the Northern District of Ohio from 1959 to 1970.	
George W. Latimer	Pi, University of Utah	Original member of the U.S. Court of Military Appeals from 1951 to 1961, member of the Utah Supreme Court from 1946 to 1951, and represented Lt. William Calley Jr. during his court martial for the My Lai incident.	
Clarence C. Newcomer	Nu, Franklin & Marshall College	U.S. Federal Judge for the Eastern District of Pennsylvania from 1971 to 1988.	

==== Ambassadors ====
Name	Original chapter	Notability	Ref.
James R. Bullington	Alpha-Delta, Auburn University	United States Ambassador to Burundi from 1983 to 1986; Peace Corps Director, Country of Niger	
Roger A. McGuire	Alpha-Theta, Beloit College	United States Ambassador to Guinea-Bissau from 1992 to 1995.	
Robert C. Strong	Alpha-Theta, Beloit College	United States Ambassador to Iraq from 1963 to 1967.	
Emory C. Swank	Nu, Franklin & Marshall College	United States Ambassador to Cambodia from 1970 to 1973.	

==== Appointees ====
Name	Original chapter	Notability	Ref.
Michael E. Fryzel	Beta Tau, Valparaiso University	Chairman of the National Credit Union Administration from 2008 - 2009 and board member until 2014.	
Gwynn Garnett	Sigma, Iowa State University	Administrator of the Foreign Agricultural Service from 1955 - 1958. Wrote the original draft of what would become the Food for Peace program.	
Andrei Iancu	Upsilon, UCLA	Director of the United States Patent and Trademark Office.	
Hans Mark	Iota, University of California, Berkeley	United States Secretary of the Air Force from 1979 to 1981. Chancellor of the University of Texas System from 1984 to 1992.	

=== State/Provincial/Territorial ===
==== Governors ====
Name	Original chapter	Notability	Ref.
Mike Beebe	Alpha-Pi, Arkansas State University	Attorney General from 2003 to 2007 and Governor of Arkansas from 2007 to 2015.	
Harry G. Leslie	Eta, Purdue University	33rd Governor of Indiana, serving from 1928 to 1932.	

==== Legislators ====
Name	Original chapter	Notability	Ref.
Bill Bailey	Gamma-Upsilon, Murray State University	Member of the Indiana House of Representatives from 1990 to 2000 and mayor of Seymour, Indiana from 1983 to 1990.	
James V. Carmichael	Psi, Emory University	Member of the Georgia General Assembly from 1935-1940. President of the Scripto pen company from 1947 to 1964.	
Robert O. Davis	Theta, Pennsylvania State University	Member of the Pennsylvania House of Representatives from 1967 to 1974.	
John R. Gregg	Alpha, Vincennes University	State representative in the Indiana House of Representatives from 1986–2002. He was the 85th and longest-serving Democratic Speaker of the Indiana House from 1996–2002. Served as Minority Leader for one term. Candidate of the Democratic Party for Governor of Indiana in 2012 and 2016.	
Ben F. Johnson	Psi, Emory University	Member of the Georgia State Senate from 1962 to 1969. Dean of the Emory University School of Law (1961 to 1973) and the Georgia State University College of Law (1981 to 1985).	
George H. Kreeger	Alpha-Phi, University of Georgia	Member of the Georgia House of Representatives from 1969 to 1976 and a state judge from 1979 to 2012.	
Tim Leslie	Beta-Omicron, California State University, Long Beach	Member of the California State Assembly from 1986 to 1991 and member of the California State Senate from 1991 to 2000.	
Christian Miele	Eta-Nu, Towson University	Member of the Maryland House of Delegates since 2015.	
James J. Rhoades	Beta-Psi, East Stroudsburg University of Pennsylvania	Member of the Pennsylvania State Senate from 1980 to 2008.	
Thomas P. Sinnett	Phi, University of Illinois	Member of the Illinois House of Representatives from 1924 to 1938. Party Floor Leader from 1933 to 1934.	
Roy A. Vitousek	Iota, University of California, Berkeley	Member of the Hawaii Territorial House of Representatives from 1922 to 1944. He served three terms as the Speaker of the Hawaii House.	
Julian Webb	Alpha-Epsilon, Mercer University	Member of the Georgia State Senate from 1963 to 1974. Assistant Party Floor Leader in 1963 and Floor Leader in 1964. He was President Pro Tem from 1967 to 1969. Member of the Georgia Court of Appeals from 1974 to 1979.	
Samuel J. Welsch	Alpha-Epsilon, Mercer University	Member of the Georgia House of Representatives from 1934 to 1938. Member of the Georgia State Senate from 1938 to 1944. Three-term mayor of Marietta, Georgia.	

==== Judges ====
Name	Original chapter	Notability	Ref.
Curtis Shake	Alpha, Vincennes University	Indiana jurist, politician, and 72nd Justice of the Indiana Supreme Court, and the presiding judge of the IG Farben trial, one of the Subsequent Nuremberg Trials	
Harold L. Ervin	Kappa, Temple University	Judge on the Superior Court of Pennsylvania from 1954 to 1967. President Judge of the court from 1965 to 1967.	
Robert L. Larson	Xi, University of Iowa	Member of the Iowa Supreme Court from 1953 to 1971, first permanent Chief Justice of the Iowa Supreme Court from 1959 to 1961, Attorney General of Iowa from 1947 to 1953.	
Benjamin K. Miller	Beta-Nu, Southern Illinois University Carbondale	Member of the Illinois Supreme Court from 1984 to 2001. Chief Justice of the court from 1991 to 1994.	

==== Other offices ====
Name	Original chapter	Notability	Ref.
Mark Brnovich	Beta-Kappa, Arizona State University	Attorney General of Arizona from 2015 to 2023.	

=== Local ===
==== Mayors ====
Name	Original chapter	Notability	Ref.
Allan Pomeroy	Alpha-Gamma, University of Washington	Mayor of Seattle, Washington from 1952 to 1956.	
Walter C. Sadler	Alpha-Beta, University of Michigan	Mayor of Ann Arbor, Michigan from 1937 to 1941.	

== Journalism ==
Name	Original chapter	Notability	Ref.
Bernie Boston	Beta-Phi, Rochester Institute of Technology	Two time Pulitzer Prize-nominated Photographer. Noted for taking the Flower Power photo and a photograph of Coretta Scott King unveiling the bust of Martin Luther King Jr. at the U.S. Capitol.	
Frank Brookhouser	Kappa, Temple University	Journalist and author. Wrote the "A Man About Town" column for the Philadelphia Evening Bulletin from 1953 to 1975 and The Philadelphia Inquirer from 1939 to 1953.	
W. M. Kiplinger	Gamma, Ohio State University	Founder of Kiplinger, a Washington, D.C.-based publisher of business forecasts and personal finance advice, available in print, online, audio, video, and software products.	
Alex Mihailovich	Eta-Rho, Carleton University	Canadian television News Anchor and Reporter	
James Reston	Phi, University of Illinois	VP, Executive Editor and Staff Member of The New York Times, Winner of the Pulitzer Prize in 1945 and 1957. He received the Presidential Medal of Freedom in 1986 and the Four Freedoms Award in 1991	
Lewis Shollenberger	Theta, Pennsylvania State University	Television correspondent and producer from 1939 to 1966	
Andrew Ross Sorkin	Mu, Cornell University	Reporter, Screenwriter, Author "Too Big To Fail, Co-Creator TV Show "Billions"	

== Military ==
Name	Original chapter	Notability	Ref.
Ben Crum Foshee	Alpha-Delta, Auburn University	Member of the Flying Tigers during World War II.	
Ray D. Free	Pi, University of Utah	Major general, United States Army Reserves; commander of the 96th United States Army Reserve Command (Gt. Douglas, UT) (1964-68); president, Reserve Officers Association (1969–70); member of the Utah House of Representatives (1979-89).	
Theodore A. Heinrich	Iota, University of California, Berkeley	Lieutenant, United States Army; served on the staff of General Dwight Eisenhower during World War II before being transferred to the Monuments Men near the end of the war.	
James E. Livingston	Alpha-Delta, Auburn University	Major general, United States Marine Corps, awarded the Medal of Honor for events happening in May 1968 in Vietnam. Also awarded the Navy Distinguished Service Medal, the Purple Heart and the Silver Star.	
James M. Lyle	Alpha-Eta, The College of William and Mary	Major general, US Army; commanding general, US Army Cadet Command	
William R. Peers	Upsilon, UCLA	Lt. general, US Army; investigator, US Army War Crimes Investigation of the My Lai Incident of Vietnam; author of The My Lai Incident	
James M. Seely	Upsilon, UCLA	Rear admiral, US Navy and acting Assistant Secretary of the Navy (Financial Management and Comptroller) from December 18, 1988, to January 1990.	
George K. Sisler	Alpha-Pi, Arkansas State University	First lieutenant, posthumously awarded the Medal of Honor for events in February 1967 in the Republic of Vietnam. Member of the 1st Special Forces	

== Other ==
Name	Original chapter	Notability	Ref.
Jeff Arnett	Epsilon-Tau, University of Tennessee at Martin	Current master distiller at Jack Daniel's.	
George E. Hargest	Kappa, Temple University	Noted philatelic named to the American Philatelic Society Hall of Fame. Editor of The Chronicle of U.S. Classic Postal Issue from 1963-1966. Author of The History of Letter Post Communications Between the United States and Europe, 1845-1875, published in 1971. Winner of the Crawford Medal in 1972 and the Luff Award in 1980.	
John Thomas Taylor	Kappa, Temple University	Lobbyist for the American Legion from 1919 to 1950. Brigadier General in the U.S. Army. First brother to appear on the cover of Time magazine in 1935.	

== Religion ==
Name	Original chapter	Notability	Ref.
The Rt. Rev. William Creighton DD	Delta, University of Pennsylvania	Fifth Episcopal Bishop of Washington, D.C., serving from 1962 to 1977. Navy chaplain during World War II. Participated in the funeral procession of the President John F. Kennedy.	
The Rt. Rev. James P. deWolfe	Lambda, Kenyon College	Fourth Episcopal Bishop of Long Island, serving from 1942 to 1966.	
The Rt. Rev. Earl Honaman	Nu, Franklin & Marshall College	Suffragan Episcopal Bishop of Central Pennsylvania from 1956 to 1969. Army chaplain during World War II, where he was awarded the Bronze Star.	
The Rt. Rev. Arthur C. Lichtenberger	Lambda, Kenyon College	21st presiding bishop of the Episcopal Church from 1958 to 1964. First Episcopal leader to meet with a pope in 1961. Had previously served as the Sixth Episcopal Bishop of Missouri from 1952 to 1959. Posthumously received the Founders Award from Sigma Pi fraternity in 2010.	
The Rt. Rev. Donald MacAdie	Lambda, Kenyon College	Suffragan Episcopal Bishop of Newark from 1958 to 1963.	
The Rt. Rev. Arthur R. McKinstry	Lambda, Kenyon College	Fifth Episcopal Bishop of Delaware, serving from 1939 to 1954. 1948 Lambeth Conference attendee. Officiated the marriage of Lyndon Johnson to Lady Bird Johnson.	
The Rt. Rev. Philip McNairy	Lambda, Kenyon College	Sixth Episcopal Bishop of Minnesota, serving from 1971 to 1977.	
The Rt. Rev. George R. Selway	Lambda, Kenyon College	Sixth Episcopal Bishop of Northern Michigan, serving from 1964 to 1972.	
The Rev. Ted G. Stone	Alpha-Nu, Wake Forest University	Southern Baptist evangelist and recovered drug addict who walked across the United States multiple times to preach on addiction.	

== Science, technology and exploration ==
Name	Original chapter	Notability	Ref.
Dr. Wilbur Davenport, PhD	Alpha-Delta, Auburn University	Early researcher into spread spectrum communication. M.I.T. professor and department head. Researcher at the Research Laboratory of Electronics and the Lincoln Lab.	
Dr. Max Mapes Ellis, PhD	Alpha, Vincennes University	Explorer, Leader of the Gimbel Scientific Expedition to British Guiana in 1911. An early researcher in water pollution.	
William D. Mensch	Kappa, Temple University	CEO of Western Design Center, Inc. and inventor of the microprocessor for the Apple II computer (the Motorola 6800 as well as the MOS 6502).	
Benjamin F. Miessner	Eta, Purdue University	Engineer and inventor who built many electric musical instruments and pioneered aircraft radio.	
Charles G. Overberger	Theta, Pennsylvania State University	President of the American Chemical Society and polymer researcher.	
Dr. Gregory Poland, MD	Epsilon-Gamma, Illinois Wesleyan University	Director of the Mayo Clinic's Vaccine Research Group, editor-in-chief of the medical journal Vaccine. Named president of the U.S. Department of Defense's Health Defense Board in 2007.	
Paul W. Richards	Beta-Theta, Drexel University	Astronaut, STS-102	
R. Tom Sawyer	Gamma, Ohio State University	Inventor of the first successful gas turbine locomotive and assisted with the development of the diesel locomotive. The ASME's R. Tom Sawyer Award is named after him.	>
Capt. Walter Marty Schirra, Jr., USN	Alpha-Mu, New Jersey Institute of Technology	Astronaut: Project Mercury, Project Gemini, and Project Apollo.	
Dr. Chauncey Guy Suits, DS	Tau, University of Wisconsin	Co-founder of the National Academy of Engineering, Director of General Electric.	
Dr. Maurice Cole Tanquary, PhD	Alpha, Vincennes University	Explorer with the Crocker Land Arctic Expedition in 1913 to North Greenland. Professor of entomology and a pioneer in modern beekeeping.	
Dr. Lee Edward Travis, PhD	Xi, University of Iowa	Psychologist and father of American Speech pathology.	
Dr. Horace M. Trent, PhD	Alpha-Lambda, Mississippi State University	Physicist best known for the discovery that a bullwhip's crack is a sonic boom and being the author of the currently accepted force-current analogy in physics known as the Trent analogy.	
Arthur W. Turner	Sigma, Iowa State	President, American Society of Agricultural and Biological Engineers; Head Researcher, USDA	
Luther S. West	Mu, Cornell University	Scientist-consultant, World Health Organization, United Nations; chief of Medical Entomology Section, Division of Parasitology, Army Medical School, Army Medical Center	

== Sports ==
=== Baseball ===
Name	Original chapter	Notability	Ref.
Mark Cresse	Beta-Omicron, California State University, Long Beach	Major League Baseball catcher with the Los Angeles Dodgers from 1974 to 1977. Bullpen coach for the Dodgers from 1977 to 1998.	
Arthur Mansfield	Tau, University of Wisconsin	Coach of the Wisconsin Badgers baseball team from 1940 to 1970.	
Jim Panther	Beta-Nu, Southern Illinois University-Carbondale	Major League Baseball pitcher with the Oakland Athletics, Texas Rangers, and the Atlanta Braves from 1971-73.	
Glenn Redmon	Alpha-Beta, University of Michigan	Major League Baseball second baseman with the Atlanta Braves in 1974.	
Tom Timmermann	Beta-Nu, Southern Illinois University-Carbondale	Professional baseball pitcher with the Detroit Tigers and Cleveland Indians from 1969 to 1974.	

=== Basketball ===
Name	Original chapter	Notability	Ref.
John C. Evans	Phi, University of Illinois	Coach of the Vermont Catamounts men's basketball team from 1940 to 1965. He was also head coach of the University of Vermont football team from 1940 to 1951.	
Fletcher Lane	Phi, University of Illinois	Coach of the University of Illinois' men's basketball team for the 1907 to 1908 season.	
James H. "Babe" McCarthy	Alpha-Lambda, Mississippi State University	College basketball head coach from 1955 to 1967. American Basketball Association head coach from 1967 to 1974. Four-time Southeastern Conference Coach of the Year. ABA coach of the year in 1974.	
John P. Sabo	Phi, University of Illinois	Head coach of the University of Rochester's men's basketball team for the 1922 to 1923 season and for the University of Vermont's men's basketball team from 1934 to 1940.	
Waldo Wegner	Sigma, Iowa State University	College Basketball All-American and Iowa State Hall of Famer from 1931 to 1935	

=== College Athletic Directors ===
Name	Original chapter	Notability	Ref.
Frank Broyles	Alpha-Sigma, University of Arkansas	NCAA football player, coach (1958-76), broadcaster, and athletic director for the University of Arkansas (1974-2007).	
Thomas Pinchkey Heard	Alpha-Kappa, Louisiana State University	Athletics Director for Louisiana State University from 1931 to 1954.	
Jay Jacobs	Alpha-Delta, Auburn University	NCAA football player and former Athletics Director at Auburn University.	
Guy "Red" Mackey	Eta, Purdue University	Legendary Boilermaker football player, three-sport varsity letterman (football, basketball, track), Mackey served as athletic director of Purdue (1942–1971), for which he was honored as the namesake of Mackey Arena at Purdue University.	

=== Football ===
Name	Original chapter	Notability	Ref.
Ralph Baker	Theta, Pennsylvania State University	Linebacker for the New York Jets of the American Football League and the National Football League from 1964 to 1974. This included being a member of the Super Bowl III championship team.	
Sherdrick Bonner	Epsilon-Iota, California State University, Northridge	Arena Football League quarterback (1993-2008) and coach (2011). 2012 inductee into the Arena Football League's Hall Of Fame.	
Frank Bykowski	Eta, Purdue University	NFL player who was a guard for the Pittsburgh Steelers in 1940. He played for the Milwaukee Chiefs of the third American Football League in 1941.	
Dana Carey	Iota, University of California, Berkeley	Professional football player in the first American Football League with the Los Angeles Wildcats in 1926.	
Will Demps	Alpha-Omega, San Diego State University	NFL safety for the Houston Texans, Baltimore Ravens, and New York Giants from 2002 to 2008.	
Earl Duvall	Epsilon, Ohio University	Professional football player in the National Football League with the Columbus Tigers from 1924 to 1926.	
Rudy Feldman	Upsilon, UCLA	Head football coach of the University of New Mexico (1968-1973). National Football League coach (1974 to 1985) and executive (1987 to 1997).	
Wayne Gift	Eta, Purdue University	NFL quarterback with the Cleveland Rams in 1937. Assistant coach in the All-America Football Conference with the Brooklyn Dodgers in 1947.	
Jeff Gossett	Beta-Gamma, Eastern Illinois University	Professional football punter in the National Football League (1981-83 and 1985-96) and the United States Football League (1984-85).	
Bob Haak	Beta, Indiana University	NFL Guard and Tackle for the Brooklyn Dodgers in 1939.	
Joe Krakoski	Phi, University of Illinois	NFL defensive back for the Washington Redskins in 1961. Defensive back for the Oakland Raiders of the American Football League from 1962 to 1966.	
Joe Laws	Xi, University of Iowa	NFL football player from 1934 to 1945. Won three NFL Championships with the Green Bay Packers where he spent his whole career. Inducted into the Green Bay Packers Hall of Fame in 1972.	
William McAndrew	Alpha, Vincennes University	First and fourth head football coach for the Southern Illinois Salukis from 1913 to 1916 and from 1921 to 1938. He also coached SIU's basketball team. Namesake of McAndrew Stadium.	
Jim McMillen	Phi, University of Illinois	NFL football player for the Chicago Bears from 1924 to 1933 where he played as a guard.	
Michael Mendoza	Beta-Iota, Northern Arizona University	Quarterback for the Los Angeles Cobras of the Arena Football League in 1988.	
Steven Montez	Delta-Zeta, University of Colorado	Quarterback for the Washington Football Team in 2020.	
Vern Mullen	Phi, University of Illinois	NFL football player from 1923-27. Won the 1923 NFL Championship with the Canton Bulldogs. First brother to play in the NFL.	
Fred Roberts	Xi, University of Iowa	NFL football guard for the 1930 - 1932 seasons with the Portsmouth Spartans.	
Tony Romo	Beta-Gamma, Eastern Illinois University	Former quarterback of the Dallas Cowboys and current analyst for CBS.	
Anthony Rubino	Alpha-Nu, Wake Forest University	Tackle with the Detroit Lions in 1943 and 1946.	
Eddie Rucinski	Beta, Indiana University	NFL football player who played end from 1941-1946 for the Brooklyn Dodgers, Chicago Cardinals, and "Card-Pitt".	
Frank Spaziani	Theta. Pennsylvania State University	Former NCAA football and baseball player. Former coach in the Canadian Football League. Former head football coach of Boston College and current Defensive coordinator for New Mexico State University.	
Steve Suhey	Theta, Pennsylvania State University	NFL football player with the Pittsburgh Steelers from 1948-49.	
Hugh Taylor	Alpha-Pi, Arkansas State University	Wide receiver for the Washington Redskins from 1947 to 1954 (holds Redskins' all-time scoring and pass-receiving records). Pro Bowl selection in 1952 and 1954. Arkansas State head coach from 1958 to 1959. Head coach of the Houston Oilers of the AFL in 1965.	
Sam Willaman	Gamma, Ohio State University	Professional football player from 1915 to 1917 under the name "Sam Williams" for the Akron Indians and the Canton Bulldogs. College head football coach at Iowa State (1922-26), Ohio State (1928-33), and Western Reserve (1934). First brother to play professional football in what was then the Ohio League.	
Clem Woltman	Eta, Purdue University	Tackle for the Philadelphia Eagles from 1938 to 1940.	
Ken Zampese	Epsilon-Chi, University of San Diego	NFL coach. Currently the Offensive coordinator for the Cincinnati Bengals.	

=== Olympics ===
Name	Original chapter	Notability	Ref.
John Carenza	Delta-Omega, Southern Illinois University-Edwardsville	NCAA and professional soccer player. Member of the 1972 U.S. Olympic team. Played for the St. Louis Stars of the North American Soccer League from 1973 to 1977.	
Arthur Cook	Alpha-Chi, University of Maryland	1948 Olympic and 1949 World Championship Games Gold Medalist in smallbore rifle shooting. Member of the 1947 and 1949 championship college rifle team. 1982 University of Maryland Athletic Hall of Fame inductee.	
Chester Newton	Omega, Oregon State University	1924 Olympic Silver Medalist in featherweight wrestling. 1980 inductee into the Oregon Sports Hall of Fame. 1991 Oregon State University Athletic Hall of Fame inductee.	
Stephen Peterson	Alpha-Upsilon, University of Rhode Island	Rower on the 1996 U.S. Olympic Team and gold medalist at the 1990 World Championships.	
Richard Pew	Mu, Cornell University	Fencer on the 1956 U.S. Olympic Team.	
Bill Spencer	Pi University of Utah	Biathlete on the 1964 and 1968 U.S. Olympic teams.	

=== Others ===
Name	Original chapter	Notability	Ref.
Fritz Bedford	Alpha-Zeta, Saint Lawrence University	Competitive swimmer in Masters swimming where he has held multiple U.S. and world records.	
Elvin C. Drake	Upsilon, UCLA	NCAA cross-country runner. UCLA head sports trainer from 1942 to 1972. UCLA head track and field coach from 1947 to 1964, winning the NCAA championship in 1956. He coached decathletes Rafer Johnson and C. K. Yang during the 1960 Summer Olympics, in which they won the gold and silver medals.	
Bill O'Neill	Theta-Beta, Saginaw Valley State University	Professional Bowler on the PBA Tour. PBA Rookie of the year in 2005-06. First person to be a two-time world champion in ten-pin bowling in 2010 and 2013.	
Bob Perani	Alpha-Zeta, Saint Lawrence University	Goaltender for the Flint Generals and the Muskegon Mohawks of the International Hockey League from 1967 to 1974.	
Frank Schmitz	Beta-Nu, Southern Illinois University Carbondale	Four time individual NCAA champion gymnast and a silver medalist at the 1965 Trampoline World Championships.	
