= George H. Kreeger =

American judge

Chief Judge of the Superior Court of Cobb County, Georgia
- In office 1997–1998

Judge of the Superior Court of Cobb County, Georgia
- In office 1984–2012

Judge of the State Court of Cobb County, Georgia
- In office 1979–1984

Member of the Georgia House of Representatives District 117 - Post 6 District 21- Post 1
- In office 1969–1977

Personal details
- Education: University of Georgia (BA, JD)

George Herman Kreeger was a member of the Georgia House of Representatives from 1969 to 1977 representing portions of Cobb County, Georgia. He then served as a judge in the Georgia courts for over thirty years.

== Early years and education ==
Kreeger graduated from the University of Georgia with a Bachelor of Science in Education in 1963. While an undergraduate, he became a member of Sigma Pi fraternity. He graduated from the University of Georgia School of Law in 1966 with his Juris Doctor degree where he was a member of Phi Delta Phi legal society.

== Legal and political career ==
After graduation, Kreeger practiced law for thirteen years with the firm of Tate and Kreeger in Marietta. In 1968, Kreeger was elected to the Georgia House of Representatives, taking office in 1969. He served four 2-year terms. Kreeger was a member of the Democratic party in a district which was increasing favoring Republicans. Kreeger was appointed to a position on the State Court of Cobb County in 1979. He served as a Cobb County Superior Court judge from 1984 to 2012, being the Chief Judge from 1997 to 1998. He also served in the Cobb County Adult Drug Court for 10 years and was the Administrative Judge for the Seventh Judicial District from 2002 to 2004. In 2012, after more than 33 years on the bench, Judge Kreeger wrote a letter to Georgia Governor Nathan Deal asking to be placed on Senior Judge status, effectively retiring. The state Judicial Nominating Committee took applications for Kreeger's position and recommend its top picks to the governor.

== Personal life ==
Kreeger is married to his wife Hellan and they have three daughters. He is a Methodist and a member of the Optimist Club.
