= List of Sigma Pi chapters =

Sigma Pi is a collegiate fraternity in North America. It was founded as Tau Phi Delta at Vincennes University on February 26, 1897. In 1907, the fraternity was renamed Sigma Pi. In 1965, the fraternity absorbed the remaining chapters of Delta Kappa fraternity.

== Collegiate chapters ==
Following is a list of Sigma Pi collegiate chapters, with active chapters indicated in bold and inactive chapters and institutions in italics.

Chapter	Charter date and range	Institution	Location	Status	Ref.
**Alpha**	February 26, 1897 – 1910, 1965	Vincennes University	Vincennes, Indiana	Active	(Note: Chapter was founded as the local Tau Phi Delta and changed its name to Sigma Pi in 1907. After going inactive, it reformed from the Corinthian Club, established in 1964.)
Phi	May 21, 1908 – November 10, 2016	University of Illinois Urbana-Champaign	Urbana, Illinois	Inactive	(Note: Chapter formed from the Sphinx Club, established in 1907. It was named Phi because the Sphinx Club was told it would be the fifteenth chapter of the Sigma Pi to make the fraternity appear larger.)
Gamma	June 6, 1908 – 1978; 1981–1995; 2011 – January 3, 2020	Ohio State University	Columbus, Ohio	Inactive	(Note: Chapter formed from Phi Kappa Phi (local), established in 1903.)
Kappa	March 13, 1909 – 1918; 1931–2003; 2005 – August 28, 2007	Temple University	Philadelphia, Pennsylvania	Inactive	(Note: Chapter formed from Sigma Delta Kappa (local), established in 1909. After going inactive, it was reformed from Kappa Phi Psi, established in 1926.)
Delta	June 5, 1909 – 1913; 1914–1938; 2002–2005; 2010 – May 21, 2012	University of Pennsylvania	Philadelphia, Pennsylvania	Inactive	(Note: Chapter formed from Sigma Omicron Pi, established in 1909. After going inactive, it reformed in 1914 from the Magpies, established in 1913.)
Epsilon	May 7, 1910 – 1943; 1972–1982; 2010 – November 1, 2019	Ohio University	Athens, Ohio	Inactive	(Note: Chapter formed from Sigma Theta Gamma (local), established in 1903. 1909. It was permanently expelled from campus in April 2019 for the hazing death of Collin Wiant.)
**Zeta**	June 1, 1912 – 2012; 2018	Ohio Northern University	Ada, Ohio	Active	(Note: Chapter formed from Phi Chi Psi Zeta, established in 1909.)
**Eta**	July 8, 1912	Purdue University	West Lafayette, Indiana	Active	(Note: Chapter formed from the Minuet Club, established in 1898.)
**Theta**	October 26, 1912 – 2012; ?	Pennsylvania State University	State College, Pennsylvania	Active	(Note: Chapter formed from the Corinthian Club, established in 1910. The university suspended the chapter in 2025 for misconduct and hazing, but the chapter continues as an independent organization, retaining its national charter)
Iota	May 5, 1913 – 1938; 1948–1966; 1975–1997; 2001 – January 10, 2025	University of California, Berkeley	Berkeley, California	Inactive	(Note: Chapter formed from the Pirate's Club, established in 1894.) (Note: Chapter was inactive during World War II.)
Lambda	May 13, 1916 – 1970	Kenyon College	Gambier, Ohio	Inactive	(Note: Chapter formed from Phi Gamma Phi (local), established in 1915.)
**Mu**	May 18, 1917	Cornell University	Ithaca, New York	Active	(Note: Chapter formed from Omega Delta (local), established in 1913 from the St. L and J Club, which was established in 1895.)
Nu	April 27, 1918 – November 17, 2018	Franklin & Marshall College	Lancaster, Pennsylvania	Inactive	(Note: Chapter formed from the Franklin Club, established in 1897.)
**Xi**	May 30, 1918 – 1938; 1961–1992; 2005	University of Iowa	Iowa City, Iowa	Active	(Note: Chapter formed from Pi Omicron (local), established in 1913.)
Omicron	March 27, 1920 – 1952; 1964–1973	Tulane University	New Orleans, Louisiana	Inactive	(Note: Chapter formed as Alpha Phi Omega (local), established in 1919.)
Pi	March 27, 1920 – 1976	University of Utah	Salt Lake City, Utah	Inactive	(Note: Chapter formed from the Sphinx local fraternity, established in 1919.)
**Rho**	May 28, 1921	North Carolina State University	Raleigh, North Carolina	Active	(Note: Chapter formed from Sigma Chi Gamma (local), established in 1914.)
Sigma	April 15, 1922 – 1943; 1955–1974; 1991 – September 5, 2021	Iowa State University	Ames, Iowa	Inactive	(Note: Chapter formed from Lambda Sigma Psi (local), established in 1915. It absorbed Lambda Delta Chi in 1929.)
**Tau**	May 20, 1922 – 1932; 1986–1988; 2005	University of Wisconsin–Madison	Madison, Wisconsin	Active	(Note: Chapter formed from Alif Mim (local), established in 1920.)
**Upsilon**	February 24, 1923 – 1970; May 18, 1975	University of California, Los Angeles	Los Angeles, California	Active	(Note: Chapter formed from the Ball and Chain Gang (local), established in 1919.)
Chi	March 23, 1923 – 1933; 1948–1960; xxxx ? – October 29, 2018	University of Pittsburgh	Pittsburgh, Pennsylvania	Inactive	(Note: Chapter formed from Delta Upsilon (local), established in 1920.)
Psi	March 29, 1924 – 1959	Emory University	Atlanta, Georgia	Inactive	(Note: Chapter formed from Beta Pi (local), established in 1921.)
**Omega**	May 10, 1924 – 1942; 1948–1985; 1992	Oregon State University	Corvallis, Oregon	Active	(Note: Chapter formed from Gamma Sigma Kappa, established in 1920.)
**Beta**	May 31, 1924 – 2021; 2025	Indiana University Bloomington	Bloomington, Indiana	Active	(Note: Chapter formed from Kappa Chi (local), established in 1923.)
Alpha Beta	April 4, 1925 – 1933; 1949–1952; 1967–1970; 2008 – October 10, 2015	University of Michigan	Ann Arbor, Michigan	Inactive	(Note: Chapter formed from Beta Phi Delta (local), established in 1921)
Alpha Gamma	January 9, 1926 – 1937; 1947–1958; 1984–1991	University of Washington	Seattle, Washington	Inactive	(Note: Chapter formed from Gamma Theta (local), established in 1923.)
**Alpha Delta**	February 26, 1926	Auburn University	Auburn, Alabama	Active	(Note: Chapter formed from Pi Omega Phi (local), established in 1921.)
Alpha Epsilon	February 26, 1927 – 1940	Mercer University	Macon, Georgia	Inactive	(Note: Chapter formed from Gamma Alpha (local), established in November 1923.)
Alpha Zeta	May 17, 1930 – October 2, 2001	St. Lawrence University	Canton, New York	Inactive	(Note: Chapter formed from Delta Tau Phi (local), established in 1919.)
**Alpha Eta**	June 6, 1931 – 1982; 1990	College of William & Mary	Williamsburg, Virginia	Active	(Note: Chapter formed from Alpha Psi (local), established in 1921.)
Alpha Theta	June 15, 1931 – 1974; 1977–1979	Beloit College	Beloit, Wisconsin	Inactive	
**Alpha Iota**	April 29, 1933	Missouri University of Science and Technology	Rolla, Missouri	Active	(Note: Chapter formed from The Prospector Club, established in 1913 at the Missouri School of Mines and Metallurgy, now Missouri University of Science and Technology.)
Alpha Kappa	May 24, 1936 – 1952; 1957–1979; 1986–1994	Louisiana State University	Baton Rouge, Louisiana	Inactive	(Note: Chapter formed from Pi Alpha Omega (local), established on December 15, 1924. In 1935, it absorbed Theta Kappa Alpha (local) which was formed in 1923.)
**Alpha Lambda**	December 11, 1937 – 1959	Mississippi State University	Starkville, Mississippi	Inactive	
**Alpha Mu**	November 26, 1938	New Jersey Institute of Technology	Newark, New Jersey	Active	(Note: Chapter formed from Beta Alpha Theta (local), established in 1922.)
**Alpha Nu**	May 12, 1940	Wake Forest University	Winston-Salem, North Carolina	Active	(Note: Chapter formed from Delta Sigma Chi (local), established in 1928.)
Alpha Xi	February 26, 1948 – 1959; xxxx ? – February 4, 2019	California State University, Fresno	Fresno, California	Inactive	
**Alpha Omicron**	February 28, 1948 – 1976; 2008	University of California, Santa Barbara	Santa Barbara, California	Active	
Alpha Pi	March 7, 1948 – December 10, 2021	Arkansas State University	Jonesboro, Arkansas	Inactive	(Note: Chapter formed from Zeta Tau Zeta (local), established in 1937.)
**Alpha Rho**	April 1, 1948 – 2008; 2014	Missouri State University	Springfield, Missouri	Active	(Note: Chapter formed from Chi Upsilon (local), established in 1946.)
Alpha Sigma	April 2, 1948 – 1977; 2009	University of Arkansas	Fayetteville, Arkansas	Active	
Alpha Tau	April 4, 1948 – 1956; 1995 – April 4, 2000	University of Louisiana at Lafayette	Lafayette, Louisiana	Inactive	(Note: Chapter formed at Southwestern Louisiana Institute of Liberal and Technical Learning, now the University of Louisiana at Lafayette.)
**Alpha Upsilon**	September 25, 1948 – 1968; 1982–1999; 2004 – February 21, 2018	University of Rhode Island	Kingston, Rhode Island	Colony	(Note: Chapter formed from Tau Sigma (local), established in June 1944.)
**Alpha Phi**	October 24, 1948 – 1974; 1981–1988; 1992	University of Georgia	Athens, Georgia	Active	
Alpha Chi	March 4, 1949 – 1993; 2009 – April 13, 2010	University of Maryland, College Park	College Park, Maryland	Inactive	
Alpha Psi	May 14, 1949 – 1962	Utah State University	Logan, Utah	Inactive	
Alpha Omega	May 18, 1949 – 1961; 1963–1974; 1975–1995; 2001 – June 12, 2008	San Diego State University	San Diego, California	Inactive	
**Beta Gamma**	June 10, 1949	Eastern Illinois University	Charleston, Illinois	Active	(Note: Chapter formed fromChi Rho (local), established in 1947.)
Beta Delta	March 25, 1950 – 1961; 2014 – March 7, 2024	University of Kansas	Lawrence, Kansas	Inactive	
Beta Epsilon	April 29, 1950 – 1953	Syracuse University	Syracuse, New York	Inactive	(Note: Chapter formed from Club 200, a local fraternity established in 1946.)
Beta Zeta	May 13, 1950 – 1964	University of Miami	Miami, Florida	Inactive	
Beta Eta	October 21, 1950 – 1977; 1993 – March 6, 2015	San Jose State University	San Jose, California	Inactive	(Note: The chapter's charter was revoked in 2015 after the university suspended the chapter for two years for failing to adhere to policies and sanctions.)
Beta Theta	November 18, 1950 – March 6, 2003	Drexel University	Philadelphia, Pennsylvania	Inactive	(Note: Chapter formed from Phi Tau Delta (local), established in 1948.)
Beta Iota	April 28, 1951 – 1991; 2017 – August 2, 2024	Northern Arizona University	Flagstaff, Arizona	Inactive	
**Beta Kappa**	April 20, 1951 – 1965; 1985–1995; 2003–2011; 2016	Arizona State University	Tempe, Arizona	Active	
Beta Lambda	May 23, 1953 –1974; 1983–1991	Lycoming College	Williamsport, Pennsylvania	Inactive	
**Beta Mu**	September 27, 1953 – 1971; 1975–1991; 2011	University of Mississippi	Oxford, Mississippi	Active	
**Beta Nu**	January 15, 1955 – 1977; 1984–2007; 2013	Southern Illinois University Carbondale	Carbondale, Illinois	Active	(Note: Chapter formed from Nu Epsilon Alpha, established in 1941.)
Beta Xi	February 5, 1955 – 1966; 1981–1986	New Mexico State University	Las Cruces, New Mexico	Inactive	(Note: Chapter formed from Alpha Delta Theta (local), established in 1923.)
**Beta Omicron**	March 12, 1955	California State University, Long Beach	Long Beach, California	Active	(Note: Chapter formed from Tau Upsilon Rho (local), established in 1950.)
**Beta Pi**	April 4, 1959	University of Virginia	Charlottesville, Virginia	Active	(Note: Chapter formed from the Corinthian Club, established in 1958.)
Beta Rho	April 25, 1959 – 1982	Atlantic Christian College	Wilson, North Carolina	Inactive	(Note: Chapter formed from Phi Delta Gamma (local), established in 1937.)
Beta Sigma	May 23, 1959 – June 7, 2012	Northern Illinois University	DeKalb, Illinois	Inactive	(Note: Chapter formed from Alpha Psi Epsilon (local), established in 1954.)
**Beta Tau**	April 2, 1960	Valparaiso University	Valparaiso, Indiana	Active	(Note: Chapter formed from Omega Chi Beta (local), established in 1947.)
Beta Upsilon	April 23, 1960 – October 16, 2002	Shippensburg University	Shippensburg, Pennsylvania	Inactive	
Beta Phi	May 14, 1960 – October 8, 2002	Rochester Institute of Technology	Henrietta, New York	Inactive	(Note: Chapter formed from Gamma Phi (local), established in 1950.)
Beta Chi	February 11, 1961 – 1989; 199x ? – July 28, 2014	Loyola University Chicago	Chicago, Illinois	Inactive	(Note: Chapter formed from the former Beta chapter of the defunct Phi Mu Chi. Beta was established in 1922 and survived its national fraternity to operate as a local group.)
**Beta Psi**	November 18, 1961 – 2006; 2011	East Stroudsburg University	East Stroudsburg, Pennsylvania	Active	
Beta Omega	December 9, 1961 – 1988; 1996 – May 5, 2005	Lock Haven University of Pennsylvania	Lock Haven, Pennsylvania	Inactive	(Note: Chapter formed from Delta Rho Beta (local), established in 1929.)
**Gamma Alpha**	May 4, 1962	University of Detroit Mercy	Detroit, Michigan	Active	
Gamma Beta	May 5, 1962 – 1972	Eastern Michigan University	Ypsilanti, Michigan	Inactive	
**Gamma Gamma**	May 13, 1962	University of Central Missouri	Warrensburg, Missouri	Active	
**Gamma Delta**	December 2, 1962 – 1996	Slippery Rock University	Slippery Rock, Pennsylvania	Colony	
Gamma Epsilon	November 12, 1963 – May 17, 2001	Fairmont State University	Fairmont, West Virginia	Inactive	
Gamma Zeta	March 7, 1964 – 1973	Parsons College	Fairfield, Iowa	Inactive	(Note: Chapter went inactive when the college closed in 1973.)
**Gamma Eta**	March 14, 1964 – 1997; 2001–2004; 2012	Rutgers University	New Brunswick, New Jersey	Active	
Delta Omicron	November 14, 1964 – 1972	University of Wisconsin–Milwaukee	Milwaukee, Wisconsin	Inactive	(Note: Chapter formed from the Omicron chapter of Delta Kappa, established in 1953, after the national merger of the two fraternities.)
Delta Sigma	November 15, 1964 – 1972; 1982–1983	University of Wisconsin–Stout	Menomonie, Wisconsin	Inactive	(Note: Chapter formed from the Sigma chapter of Delta Kappa, established in 1951, after the national merger of the two fraternities.)
Gamma Theta	January 9, 1965 – 1972; 1999 – February 20, 2019	University of Texas at Austin	Austin, Texas	Inactive	
Delta Chi	March 27, 1965 – 1970; 1994 – May 20, 1999	Western State College of Colorado	Gunnison, Colorado	Inactive	(Note: Chapter formed from the Chi Sigma chapter of Delta Kappa, established in 1963, after the merger of the two fraternities.)
**Gamma Iota**	May 1, 1965	Worcester Polytechnic Institute	Worcester, Massachusetts	Active	(Note: Chapter formed from Psi Theta Nu (local), established in 1961.)
Gamma Kappa	March 19, 1966 – February 17, 2012	Indiana Institute of Technology	Fort Wayne, Indiana	Inactive	(Note: Chapter formed from the Gamma chapter of Theta Mu Pi, established on February 14, 1947. In 1957, it became a chapter of Beta Sigma Tau but had to resign its charter in 1960 because of the college's accreditation status.)
Gamma Lambda	May 21, 1966 – 1976	University of Wisconsin–Stevens Point	Stevens Point, Wisconsin	Inactive	
**Gamma Mu**	April 22, 1966 – 1976; 1985	University of Wisconsin–Oshkosh	Oshkosh, Wisconsin	Active	
Gamma Nu	October 15, 1966 – September 28, 1999	University of Akron	Akron, Ohio	Inactive	
Gamma Xi	April 22, 1967 – December 4, 2019	West Virginia University Institute of Technology	Montgomery, West Virginia	Inactive	(Note: Chapter formed from Beta Kappa Chi (local), established in 1926.)
Gamma Omicron	May 6, 1967 – July 28, 1999	University of Findlay	Findlay, Ohio	Inactive	(Note: Chapter formed from Phi Sigma Chi, established in 1965.)
Gamma Pi	May 13, 1967 – 199x ?; 2003 – June 30, 2005	Indiana State University	Terre Haute, Indiana	Inactive	
Gamma Rho	October 21, 1967 – September 19, 2013	Western Michigan University	Kalamazoo, Michigan	Inactive	
**Gamma Sigma**	April 27, 1966 – 1989; 1997 – January 12, 2018	University of Missouri	Columbia, Missouri	Colony	
Gamma Tau	April 20, 1968 – 1989; 1997 – March 13, 2008	Georgia Southern University	Statesboro, Georgia	Inactive	(Note: Chapter formed from Kappa Delta Chi (local), established in 1967.)
**Gamma Upsilon**	May 4, 1968	Murray State University	Murray, Kentucky	Active	
Delta Gamma	May 18, 1968 – 1974	Milton College	Milton, Wisconsin	Inactive	(Note: Chapter formed from the Chi Gamma chapter of Delta Kappa, established in 1953, after the national merger of the two fraternities. It went inactive when the college closed in 1974.)
Gamma Phi	May 18, 1968 – 1977	University of Wisconsin–Whitewater	Whitewater, Wisconsin	Inactive	(Note: Chapter formed from the Lancers, (local), established in 1965.)
Gamma Chi	May 25, 1968 – 1972	Quinnipiac University	Hamden, Connecticut	Inactive	(Note: Chapter formed from Kappa Alpha Psi (local), established in 1966.)
Gamma Psi	February 1, 1969 – 1972; 1979–1982	Saint Louis University	St. Louis, Missouri	Inactive	(Note: Chapter formed from a chapter of Kappa Mu Sigma, established in 1956. In October 1968, Alpha Phi Chi, a local fraternity established in 1966, merged with Kappa Mu Sigma, which was at that time a Sigma Pi colony.)
Gamma Omega	February 14, 1969 – 2022	Wayne State University	Detroit, Michigan	Active	
**Delta Alpha**	February 16, 1969 – 2008; 2014	Central Michigan University	Mount Pleasant, Michigan	Active	
**Delta Beta**	March 22, 1969 – 1975; 1991	Monmouth University	West Long Branch, New Jersey	Active	(Note: Chapter formed from Alpha Theta Chi (local), established in 1959.)
Delta Epsilon	March 23, 1969 – April 24, 2018	Seton Hall University	South Orange, New Jersey	Inactive	(Note: Chapter formed from Tau Sigma Phi (local), established in 1962.)
Delta Zeta	April 12, 1969 – February 12, 2021	University of Missouri–St. Louis	St. Louis, Missouri	Inactive	(Note: Chapter formed from the Beta chapter of Sigma Kappa Phi, established in October 1966.)
Delta Eta	November 23, 1969 – 1975	Youngstown State University	Youngstown, Ohio	Inactive	(Note: Chapter formed from Theta Tau (local), established in 1968.)
Delta Theta	February 7, 1970 – 1973	Texas A&I University at Corpus Christi	Corpus Christi, Texas	Inactive	(Note: Chapter formed from Phi Upsilon Pi (local), established in 1965.)
**Delta Iota**	April 11, 1970	University of Wisconsin–Platteville	Platteville, Wisconsin	Active	(Note: Chapter formed from Delta Chi Epsilon (local), established in 1965.)
Delta Lambda	April 24, 1970 – 1989; 2001 – June 26, 2017	Louisiana Tech University	Ruston, Louisiana	Inactive	
Delta Mu	May 8, 1970 – March 5, 1999	Salem University	Salem, West Virginia	Inactive	(Note: Chapter formed from Chi Sigma Delta (local), established in 1965.)
Delta Pi	May 9, 1970 – 1973; 2000 – November 13, 2002	Bloomsburg University of Pennsylvania	Bloomsburg, Pennsylvania	Inactive	(Note: Chapter formed from Delta Pi (local), established in 1967.)
Delta Nu	November 14, 1970 – 1977; 1986–1996	Ball State University	Muncie, Indiana	Inactive	(Note: Chapter formed from Tau Phi Delta, a local fraternity created in September 1968 by transfers from the Sigma Pi Alpha chapter with the intent of starting a chapter.)
Delta Xi	November 14, 1970 – 1973; 19xx ? – May 20, 1999	Southern Utah University	Cedar City, Utah	Inactive	(Note: Chapter formed from Gamma Psi Upsilon (local), established in 1948.)
**Delta Rho**	April 17, 1971	Morehead State University	Morehead, Kentucky	Active	
Delta Tau	May 16, 1971 – 1988	Indiana University South Bend	South Bend, Indiana	Inactive	(Note: Chapter formed from Phi Delta (local), established on April 24, 1970.)
Delta Upsilon	April 22, 1971 – 1977; 1990 – April 17, 2009	Virginia Tech	Blacksburg, Virginia	Inactive	(Note: Chapter formed from Delta Sigma Tau (local), established in 1968. The chapter's charter was revoked in 2009 for violations of fraternity and university risk management policies, specifically related to alcohol.)
Delta Phi	October 30, 1971 – 1987	University of Wisconsin–La Crosse	La Crosse, Wisconsin	Inactive	(Note: Chapter formed from Beta Sigma Chi (local), established in 1934.)
Delta Psi	November 12, 1971 – January 5, 2001	Troy State University	Troy, Alabama	Inactive	(Note: Chapter formed from Sigma Alpha (local), established in 1968)
Delta Omega	April 8, 1972 – August 16, 2018	Southern Illinois University Edwardsville	Edwardsville, Illinois	Inactive	(Note: Chapter formed from Pi Delta Alpha (local), established on January 9, 1971.)
Epsilon Alpha	October 28, 1972 – 2015	Southern Polytechnic State University	Marietta, Georgia	Moved	(Note: Chapter was formed from Sigma Delta Phi local fraternity, established at Southern Technical Institute in 1960. The institution became Southern Polytechnic State University in 1996 and merged into Kennesaw State University in 2015. The moved chapter eventually changed its name to Iota Psi.)
**Epsilon Beta**	October 20, 1973 – 2011; 2017	University of Kentucky	Lexington, Kentucky	Active	
Epsilon Gamma	January 25, 1975 – May 21, 2012	Illinois Wesleyan University	Bloomington, Illinois	Inactive	(Note: Chapter formed from Zeta Epsilon (local), established in 1969.)
Epsilon Delta	May 31, 1975 – 1987	Columbus State University	Columbus, Georgia	Inactive	(Note: Chapter formed from Sigma Pi Upsilon, established in 1974.)
Epsilon Epsilon	March 6, 1976 – July 30, 2020	Emporia State University	Emporia, Kansas	Inactive	
Epsilon Zeta	May 1, 1976 – May 6, 2023	Western Illinois University	Macomb, Illinois	Inactive	
**Epsilon Eta**	March 19, 1977 – 2002; 2017	Illinois State University	Normal, Illinois	Active	
**Epsilon Theta**	April 23, 1977 – 2014; 2021	Elon University	Elon, North Carolina	Active	
Epsilon Iota	November 19, 1977 – 1997	California State University, Northridge	Los Angeles, California	Inactive	
**Epsilon Kappa**	December 3, 1977	Southern Arkansas University	Magnolia, Arkansas	Active	
**Epsilon Lambda**	April 22, 1978	Eastern Kentucky University	Richmond, Kentucky	Active	
Epsilon Mu	April 29, 1978 – May 1, 1999	James Madison University	Harrisonburg, Virginia	Inactive	
**Epsilon Nu**	December 10, 1978 – 2003; 2017	California State University, Fullerton	Fullerton, California	Active	
**Epsilon Xi**	May 6, 1979 – 1994; 2006	Fairleigh Dickinson University	Rutherford, New Jersey	Active	
Epsilon Omicron	December 1, 1979 – January 3, 2020	University at Buffalo	Buffalo, New York	Inactive	
**Epsilon Pi**	April 4, 1981 – August 28, 2007	Christopher Newport University	Newport News, Virginia	Colony	
**Epsilon Rho**	April 17, 1982	Drury University	Springfield, Missouri	Active	
Epsilon Sigma	April 17, 1982 – December 8, 1998	Loyola Marymount University	Los Angeles, California	Inactive	
Epsilon Tau	May 1, 1982 – 1996	University of Tennessee at Martin	Martin, Tennessee	Inactive	
Epsilon Upsilon	November 18, 1982 – 1986	University of California, Davis	Davis, California	Inactive	
Epsilon Phi	November 20, 1982 – October 29, 2012	Embry-Riddle Aeronautical University, Prescott	Prescott, Arizona	Inactive	
Epsilon Chi	April 16, 1983 – 1995; 2016 – December 6, 2024	University of San Diego	San Diego, California	Active	
Epsilon Psi	April 23, 1983 – June 26, 2002	Widener University	Chester, Pennsylvania	Inactive	(Note: Chapter formed from Phi Sigma Pi Epsilon, established in 1973.)
Epsilon Omega	November 5, 1983 – April 30, 2008	State University of New York at Potsdam	Potsdam, New York	Inactive	
**Zeta Alpha**	February 4, 1984	West Chester University	West Chester, Pennsylvania	Active	
Zeta Beta	February 25, 1984 – November 30, 2009	Embry–Riddle Aeronautical University, Daytona Beach	Daytona Beach, Florida	Inactive	(Note: The chapter's charter was revoked for violations of alcohol, drug, and safety policies.)
Zeta Gamma	April 28, 1984 – July 28, 2011	Millersville University	Millersville, Pennsylvania	Inactive	(Note: Chapter originated with Sigma Epsilon Beta (local) in 1966, which merged with Mu Alpha Kappa (local) in 1983, before joining Sigma Pi.)
**Zeta Delta**	April 28, 1984 – 1986; 1998	University of Colorado Boulder	Boulder, Colorado	Active	
**Zeta Epsilon**	April 28, 1984	Michigan Technological University	Houghton, Michigan	Active	
Zeta Zeta	October 27, 1984 – 1998; 2005 – October 29, 2012	University of Florida	Gainesville, Florida	Inactive	
**Zeta Eta**	January 19, 1985	Santa Clara University	Santa Clara, California	Active	
Zeta Theta	January 26, 1985 – November 2, 2001	State University of New York at Plattsburgh	Plattsburgh, New York	Inactive	
Zeta Iota	March 2, 1985 – July 28, 1999	University of Western Ontario	London, Ontario, Canada	Inactive	
Zeta Kappa	April 13, 1985 – February 6, 1998	California State University, Bakersfield	Bakersfield, California	Inactive	
Zeta Lambda	April 27, 1985 – 2001	University of Southern California	Los Angeles, California	Inactive	
**Zeta Mu**	May 18, 1985 – 1995; 1999	Michigan State University	East Lansing, Michigan	Active	
Zeta Nu	October 31, 1985 – June 18, 2007	Villanova University	Philadelphia, Pennsylvania	Inactive	
Zeta Xi	December 14, 1985 – 1989	Southeastern Oklahoma State University	Durant, Oklahoma	Withdrew (local)	(Note: Chapter formed from Delta Chi Delta (local), established in 1969. In 1989, it withdrew and again became Delta Chi Delta.)
Zeta Omicron	January 11, 1986 – September 23, 2022	Lawrence Technological University	Southfield, Michigan	Inactive	
**Zeta Pi**	March 15, 1986	Oakland University	Rochester, Michigan	Active	(Note: Chapter originated as Omega Nu Pi local fraternity, which became a Lambda Chi Alpha colony, until Lambda Chi Alpha closed its expansions. Then, it became a Sigma Pi colony.)
Zeta Rho	March 22, 1986 – April 6, 2000	Edinboro University of Pennsylvania	Edinboro, Pennsylvania	Inactive	
Zeta Sigma	April 5, 1986 – May 1, 2003	North Carolina Wesleyan College	Rocky Mount, North Carolina	Inactive	(Note: Chapter formed from Pi Kappa Omega (local), established in 1979.)
Zeta Tau	May 9, 1987 – October 31, 2008	University of Northern Colorado	Greeley, Colorado	Inactive	
Zeta Upsilon	May 16, 1987 – 1996	University of California, San Diego	San Diego, California	Inactive	
Zeta Phi	September 26, 1987 – 1994	Southeastern Louisiana University	Hammond, Louisiana	Inactive	
**Zeta Chi**	March 5, 1988	Rowan University	Glassboro, New Jersey	Active	
Zeta Psi	April 16, 1988 – 1991	West Virginia University	Morgantown, West Virginia	Inactive	
Zeta Omega	April 23, 1988 – 1996	University of Nevada, Reno	Reno, Nevada	Inactive	
**Eta Alpha**	April 23, 1988 – August 5, 2013	California State University, Sacramento	Sacramento, California	Colony	
Eta Beta	April 30, 1988 – March 23, 1999	Southern Connecticut State University	New Haven, Connecticut	Inactive	(Note: Chapter formed from Beta Mu Sigma, established in 1961.)
Eta Gamma	May 7, 1988 – March 1, 2016	Hofstra University	Long Island, New York	Inactive	
**Eta Delta**	May 21, 1988 – 1999; 2008	California Polytechnic State University, San Luis Obispo	San Luis Obispo, California	Active	
Eta Epsilon	November 19, 1988 – 2001; 2008 –February 4, 2022	Florida State University	Tallahassee, Florida	Inactive	
Eta Zeta	April 8, 1989 – 1995	Western Connecticut State University	Danbury, Connecticut	Inactive	(Note: Chapter formed from Chi Epsilon Sigma, established in 1966.)
**Eta Eta**	April 15, 1989	Bridgewater State University	Bridgewater, Massachusetts	Active	(Note: Chapter formed from Delta Pi (local), established in 1987.)
Eta Theta	April 22, 1989 – February 7, 2009	York College of Pennsylvania	York, Pennsylvania	Inactive	(Note: Chapter formed from Zeta Phi Omicron (local), established in 1984.)
**Eta Iota**	May 13, 1989	California State University, Dominguez Hills	Carson, California	Active	
**Eta Kappa**	April 21, 1990 – 2009; 2017	East Carolina University	Greenville, North Carolina	Active	
Eta Lambda	April 28, 1990 – December 14, 1999	University at Albany, SUNY	Albany, New York	Inactive	
Eta Mu	May 5, 1990 – November 17, 2018	Missouri Southern State University	Joplin, Missouri	Inactive	
Eta Nu	October 27, 1990 – 2013; 2021 – July 28, 2023	Towson University	Towson, Maryland	Inactive	
Eta Xi	November 10, 1990 – November 2, 1999	University of North Carolina at Asheville	Asheville, North Carolina	Inactive	
Eta Omicron	January 19, 1991 – October 10, 2015	University of Toronto	Toronto, Ontario, Canada	Inactive	
Eta Pi	December 14, 1991 – January 10, 2014	Kutztown University	Kutztown, Pennsylvania	Inactive	
Eta Rho	April 11, 1992 – November 16, 2022	Carleton University	Ottawa, Ontario, Canada	Inactive	
**Eta Sigma**	April 24, 1993 – 2004; 2014	Colorado State University	Fort Collins, Colorado	Active	
**Eta Tau**	February 19, 1994	Fitchburg State University	Fitchburg, Massachusetts	Active	
**Eta Upsilon**	March 11, 1995	University of California, Irvine	Irvine, California	Active	
Eta Phi	March 25, 1995 – 2022	Miami University	Oxford, Ohio	Inactive	
Eta Chi	May 13, 1995 – 1996	DePaul University	Chicago, Illinois	Inactive	(Note: Chapter formed from Tau Delta Rho, established in 1919.)
Eta Psi	April 20, 1996 – January 29, 2016	Clemson University	Clemson, South Carolina	Inactive	
Eta Omega	September 27, 1996 – October 9, 2014	Johnson & Wales University	Providence, Rhode Island	Inactive	
Theta Alpha	March 15, 1997 – July 28, 2005	Clarion University of Pennsylvania	Clarion, Pennsylvania	Inactive	
**Theta Beta**	April 25, 1997	Saginaw Valley State University	University Center, Michigan	Active	
**Theta Gamma**	October 4, 1998	University of West Alabama	Livingston, Alabama	Active	
Theta Delta	April 15, 2000 – June 7, 2024	The College of New Jersey	Ewing, New Jersey	Inactive	
**Theta Epsilon**	May 5, 2001	Indiana University of Pennsylvania	Indiana, Pennsylvania	Active	
Theta Zeta	April 27, 2002 – February 24, 2006	Lynchburg College	Lynchburg, Virginia	Inactive	(Note: Chapter formed from Delta Lambda Chi, established in 2000.)
**Theta Eta**	January 25, 2003	Old Dominion University	Norfolk, Virginia	Active	
**Theta Theta**	March 29, 2003	Ferris State University	Big Rapids, Michigan	Active	(Note: Chapter formed from Tau Phi Delta, established in 1998.)
Theta Iota	April 26, 2003 – September 20, 2025	Penn State Altoona	Altoona, Pennsylvania	Inactive	
Theta Kappa	April 26, 2003 – June 2, 2010	Texas Tech University	Lubbock, Texas	Inactive	
**Theta Lambda**	November 8, 2003	Radford University	Radford, Virginia	Active	
Theta Mu	November 15, 2003 – March 29, 2024	California State University, Chico	Chico, California	Inactive	(Note: Chapter formed from Phi Nu Chi (local), established in 2000.)
**Theta Nu**	November 22, 2003	University of Houston	Houston, Texas	Active	
Theta Xi	April 24, 2004 – 2023	Salisbury University	Salisbury, Maryland	Inactive	
**Theta Omicron**	May 8, 2004	University of Alabama	Tuscaloosa, Alabama	Active	
Theta Pi	February 26, 2005 – August 27, 2009	University of Arizona	Tucson, Arizona	Inactive	
**Theta Rho**	February 26, 2005	Grand Valley State University	Allendale, Michigan	Active	
**Theta Sigma**	September 24, 2005	Ursinus College	Collegeville, Pennsylvania	Active	
**Theta Tau**	October 8, 2005	William Paterson University	Wayne, New Jersey	Active	
Theta Upsilon	April 8, 2006 – August 31, 2010	Texas State University	San Marcos, Texas	Inactive	
**Theta Phi**	November 18, 2006	Pennsylvania College of Technology	Williamsport, Pennsylvania	Active	
Theta Chi	April 10, 2007 – December 4, 2019	Saint Joseph's University	Philadelphia, Pennsylvania	Inactive	
**Theta Psi**	April 14, 2007	University of Southern Indiana	Evansville, Indiana	Active	
**Theta Omega**	April 21, 2007	Middle Tennessee State University	Murfreesboro, Tennessee	Active	
Iota Alpha	May 5, 2007 – October 10, 2015	Kansas State University	Manhattan, Kansas	Inactive	
**Iota Beta**	October 20, 2007 – 2017; 2022	University of Delaware	Newark, Delaware	Active	
Iota Gamma	November 3, 2007 – June 18, 2012	Texas A&M University	College Station, Texas	Inactive	
**Iota Delta**	November 10, 2007	University of Texas at San Antonio	San Antonio, Texas	Active	
**Iota Epsilon**	November 17, 2007 – December 14, 2015	University of Oregon	Eugene, Oregon	Colony	
**Iota Zeta**	April 12, 2008	University of Minnesota	Minneapolis, Minnesota	Active	
Iota Eta	January 17, 2009 – February 5, 2025	University of California, Santa Cruz	Santa Cruz, California	Inactive	
**Iota Theta**	March 28, 2009	Bentley University	Waltham, Massachusetts	Active	
**Iota Iota**	May 2, 2009	Montclair State University	Montclair, New Jersey	Active	
**Iota Kappa**	August 22, 2009	University of Central Florida	Orlando, Florida	Active	
Iota Lambda	November 7, 2009 - January 2026	Arkansas Tech University	Russellville, Arkansas	Inactive	
Iota Mu	November 14, 2009 – June 26, 2017	Georgia Tech	Atlanta, Georgia	Inactive	
Iota Nu	April 3, 2010 – May 16, 2025	Washington State University	Pullman, Washington	Inactive	
Iota Xi	April 14, 2012 – May 16, 2016	Duke University	Durham, North Carolina	Inactive	
Iota Omicron	April 28, 2012 – February 21, 2022	University of Louisville	Louisville, Kentucky	Inactive	
Iota Pi	April 27, 2013 – December 21, 2017	Oklahoma State University	Stillwater, Oklahoma	Inactive	
**Iota Rho**	April 26, 2014	Keene State College	Keene, New Hampshire	Active	
**Iota Sigma**	March 14, 2015	University of South Florida	Tampa, Florida	Active	
**Iota Tau**	September 19, 2015	St. John's University	Queens, New York	Active	
**Iota Upsilon**	November 19, 2016	Stockton University	Galloway Township, New Jersey	Active	
**Iota Phi**	February 25, 2018	Fairleigh Dickinson University - Florham	Florham Park, New Jersey	Active	
**Iota Chi**	November 11, 2023	Coastal Carolina University	Conway, South Carolina	Active	
Iota Psi	2016 – January 3, 2020	Kennesaw State University	Kennesaw, Georgia	Inactive	

== Alumni clubs ==
Following are the Sigma Pi alumni clubs, with active clubs indicated in bold and inactive clubs in italics.

Association	Chapter affiliation	Location	Status	Ref.
Alpha-Rho Alumni Association	Missouri State (Alpha-Rho)	Springfield, Missouri	Active	
Beach Cities Alumni Club	Cal State Long Beach (Beta-Omicron)	Tustin, California	Active	
Cascade Alumni Club	Oregon State (Omega)	Portland, Oregon	Active	
Central Iowa Alumni Association	Iowa (Xi) and Iowa State (Sigma)	Iowa City, Iowa	Active	
Cletus A. Broecker Alumni Club	Purdue (Eta)	Elmhurst, Illinois	Active	
Eastern North Carolina Alumni Club	East Carolina (Eta-Kappa)	Wake Forest, North Carolina	Active	
Eta-Eta Alumni Association	Bridgewater State (Eta-Eta)	Bridgewater, Massachusetts	Active	
Kentucky Thoroughbred Alumni Club	Murray State (Gamma-Upsilon)	Western Kentucky, Kentucky	Active	
Mountain City Alumni Club	Central Michigan (Delta-Alpha)	Mount Pleasant, Michigan	Active	
Niagara Frontier Alumni Association	Buffalo (Epsilon-Omicron)	Buffalo, New York	Active	
North Jersey Alumni Club	NJIT (Alpha-Mu)	Newark, New Jersey	Active	
Orange County Alumni Association	Fullerton, CA (Epsilon-Nu)	Orange County, California	Active	
Prospectors Club Alumni Association	Missouri S&T (Alpha-Iota)	Rolla, Missouri	Active	
Psi Theta Nu Alumni Club	Worcester Polytechnic (Gamma-Iota)	Ashland, Massachusetts	Active	
Rho Alumni of Sigma Pi Alumni Association	Raleigh, NC (Rho)	Raleigh, North Carolina	Active	
River City Alumni Association	Sacramento State (Eta-Alpha)	Sacramento, California	Active	
Sigma Pi Alive Alumni Association	Penn College (Theta-Phi)	Williamsport, Pennsylvania	Active	
Sigma Pi Alumni Association of Saginaw	Saginaw Valley State (Theta-Beta)	Saginaw, Michigan	Active	
Sigma Pi Alumni Association of Western Pennsylvania	Slippery Rock (Gamma-Delta)	Erie, Pennsylvania	Active	
The Mu Chapter Cornell University Alumni Association	Cornell (Mu)	Ithica, New York	Active	
Theta-Theta Alumni Club	Ferris State (Theta-Theta)	Big Rapids, Michigan	Active	
TriStar Alumni Club	Middle Tennessee (Theta-Omega)	Murfreesboro, Tennessee	Active	
Upsilon Alumni Association	UCLA (Upsilon)	Los Angeles, California	Active	
Zeta-Epsilon Alumni Corporation	Michigan Tech (Zeta-Epsilon)	Houghton, Michigan	Active	
