= Earl Duvall (American football) =

American football player (1899–1966)

No. 21
- Positions: Guard, tackle, end

Personal information
- Born: June 20, 1899; Duvall, Ohio
- Died: August 6, 1966 (aged 67)
- Listed height: 6 ft 0 in (1.83 m)
- Listed weight: 220 lb (100 kg)

Career information
- High school: Ashville (OH)
- College: Ohio University

Career history
- Columbus Tigers (1924–1926)

Earl Scranton Duvall (June 20, 1899 – August 6, 1966) was an American football player. He played college football for Ohio University as a fullback. While in college, he joined Sigma Pi fraternity. As a professional, he played at the guard, tackle, and end positions in the National Football League (NFL) for the Columbus Tigers from 1924 to 1926. He appeared in 21 NFL games, 14 as a starter.

After football, Duvall would become vice president of the State Automobile Insurance Company and was a member of the Ohio University Alumni Association and the Jacques Club.
