= Earl Honaman =

American Episcopal bishop

- Suffragan Bishop of Central Pennsylvania
- Church: Episcopal Church (United States)
- Diocese: Central Pennsylvania
- Other post: Military Chaplain

Orders
- Ordination: 1928
- Consecration: February 24, 1956

Personal details
- Born: April 13, 1904 Lancaster, Pennsylvania
- Died: March 17, 1982 (aged 77) Lititz, Pennsylvania
- Denomination: Episcopal Church
- Parents: Walter H. and Ada R. Honaman
- Spouse: Mary Shenk
- Children: Frederich and Walter
- Education: Franklin and Marshall College; Philadelphia Divinity School

Earl M. Honaman (April 13, 1904 – March 17, 1982) was the only suffragan bishop in the history of the Episcopal Diocese of Central Pennsylvania (then named the Diocese of Harrisburg), serving from 1956 to 1969.

== Personal life ==
Honaman was a native of Lancaster, Pennsylvania and was the son of Walter K. and Ada R. Honaman. He received his Bachelor of Arts degree from Franklin and Marshall College in 1922 where he was a member of Phi Beta Kappa and Sigma Pi fraternity. He graduated cum laude from the Philadelphia Divinity School in 1928 and was ordained that same year. He was married to Mary Shenk Honaman and they had two sons, Frederich and Walter.

== Military Chaplain ==
Honaman was a chaplain in the United States Army Reserve from 1934 until 1940. After the start of World War II, he became a chaplain in the United States Army, with the rank of lieutenant colonel from 1941 until 1945. His army experience as Division Chaplain of the 28th Infantry Division included the famous Battle of the Bulge. During the war he received the Bronze Star. From 1946 to 1950 he served as chaplain in the Pennsylvania National Guard. He again served as a chaplain for the United States Army from 1950 until 1951.

In recognition of his distinguished service to Church and country, the Doctor of Divinity degree, honoris causa, was conferred upon Bishop Honaman by both the Philadelphia Divinity School and Franklin and Marshall College.

== Civilian Ministry ==
Except for the years when he was in the military, Honaman spent his entire ministry in his native diocese, serving, in turn, as vicar, as rector, and as archdeacon. He was Rector of St. John's Church in York and Rector of St. John's Church in Carlisle. He was elected Suffragan Bishop of the Diocese of Central Pennsylvania in the fall of 1955,.
