= Sigma Pi =

North American collegiate fraternity

- ΣΠ
- Founded: February 26, 1897; 129 years ago Vincennes University
- Type: Social
- Former affiliation: NIC
- Status: Active
- Scope: North America
- Pillars: Brotherhood, Aristocracy, Morality, Chivalry, and Righteousness
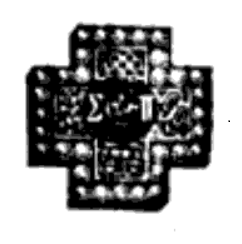
- Member badge
- Colors: Primary; Lavender and White; Auxiliary: Gold
- Symbol: Owl
- Flag
- Flower: Lavender orchid, alternates of White rose and Lilac. Goldenrod as auxiliary
- Jewel: Emerald
- Publication: The Emerald
- Chapters: 97 active chapters, 45 alumni clubs, 131 inactive chapters
- Colonies: 5
- Members: 5,000+ active 118,000+ lifetime
- Headquarters: 1101 Kermit Drive, Suite 730; Nashville, Tennessee 37217; United States
- Website: sigmapi.org

Sigma Pi (ΣΠ) is a collegiate fraternity in North America. As of 2021, it had more than 5,000 undergraduate members and over 118,000 alumni. The fraternity is headquartered in Nashville, Tennessee.

Founded on February 26, 1897, at Vincennes University by William R. Kennedy, James T. Kingsbury, George M. Patterson, and Rolin R. James, the group was initially known as Tau Phi Delta (ΤΦΔ). In 1907, the fraternity was renamed Sigma Pi. This change was instigated by Robert George Patterson (no relation to founder George M. Patterson), a student at Ohio State University. Patterson had wanted to join the Sigma Pi literary society at Illinois College in Jacksonville, Illinois, but after his request to expand the society to OSU was declined, he approached Tau Phi Delta members, claiming to represent a historic fraternity called Sigma Pi that dated to the 18th century. Tau Phi Delta accepted Patterson's invitation to merge and adopted the name Sigma Pi. Later, Patterson's "history" of Sigma Pi was shown to be false, but the organization kept the name.

Sigma Pi oversees several charitable programs, including the Altruistic Campus Experience (ACE), and maintains the Sigma Pi Educational Foundation "to assist needy and deserving students to complete their education, and to aid aged or disabled former students who are in need or worthy of assistance."

== History ==
=== Founders ===

- Rolin Rosco James (October 16, 1879 – February 4, 1953): Born in Lincolnville, Indiana. Graduated from Vincennes University in 1900; A. B., Earlham College, 1902; Studied at Harvard Law School. He was a member of the Presbyterian Church and by profession, a consulting attorney.
- William Raper Kennedy (November 22, 1877 – December 5, 1944): Born in Vincennes, Indiana. Graduated Vincennes University in 1897. Served in the Spanish–American War and re-enlisted in the infantry a month after being discharged. He was continuously in military service and rose to the rank of lieutenant colonel in the infantry. He was a faculty member at Culver Military Academy from 1905 until retiring in 1944.
- James Thompson Kingsbury (January 8, 1877 – October 1, 1950): Born in Lawrence County, Illinois. Descended from the Kingsbury family who settled in Massachusetts in 1615. Graduated Vincennes University in 1897; A. B. University of Illinois 1899, LL.B 1902. Practiced law in Bisbee, Arizona. He was a member of the Christian Church and of Masonic Lodges in Tombstone, Arizona and Phoenix.
- George Martin Patterson (November 7, 1877 – April 7, 1960): Born in Palmyra, Township, Knox County, Indiana. His ancestors settled in Vincennes before Indiana became a state and were prominent in the development of that part of the country. Served as the Deputy Recorder of Knox County and then followed in his father's footsteps of farming.

=== Founding and early history (1897–1908) ===
On January 26, 1897, Charlotte N. Mallote, a professor of Latin and French, spoke to a group of students during chapel hour at Vincennes University about College Fraternities. One month later, on February 26, 1897, a new literary society had its first meeting, founded by James, Kennedy, Patterson, and Kingsbury. The first two initiates of the society were Samuel and Maurice Bayard, who joined before a name or constitution was established. The constitution, name, and first ritual were developed at the Bayards' home. The founders soon agreed upon a name, and the society was christened Tau Phi Delta (ΤΦΔ). By the end of its first year in 1898, Tau Phi Delta had 10 members, but the new Fraternity encountered membership struggles at the turn of the 20th century, with many of America's young men leaving to fight in the Spanish–American War. Personal endeavors were paused, while national efforts and resources focused on the war in the Caribbean and Pacific Oceans. Key members of Tau Phi Delta, William Raper Kennedy, Lee B. Purcell, and Maurice Bayard, all left to fight in the war, leaving James as the sole member by the end of the war. James restored the society by initiating five new members shortly after the turn of the 20th century. These new members pressured James to change the name to Theta Gamma Psi (ΘΓΨ), but James successfully argued to keep the name Tau Phi Delta. In 1903–1904, the Fraternity had grown so large that it stopped meeting at Vincennes and began meeting at The Bayard Cottage, considered the fraternity's first chapter house. In 1907, Tau Phi Delta began meeting at the old colonial residence of Judge J.P.L Weems. It was in the Niblack-Weems household that Tau Phi Delta was rechristened as Sigma Pi. The home would later host the first national congress.

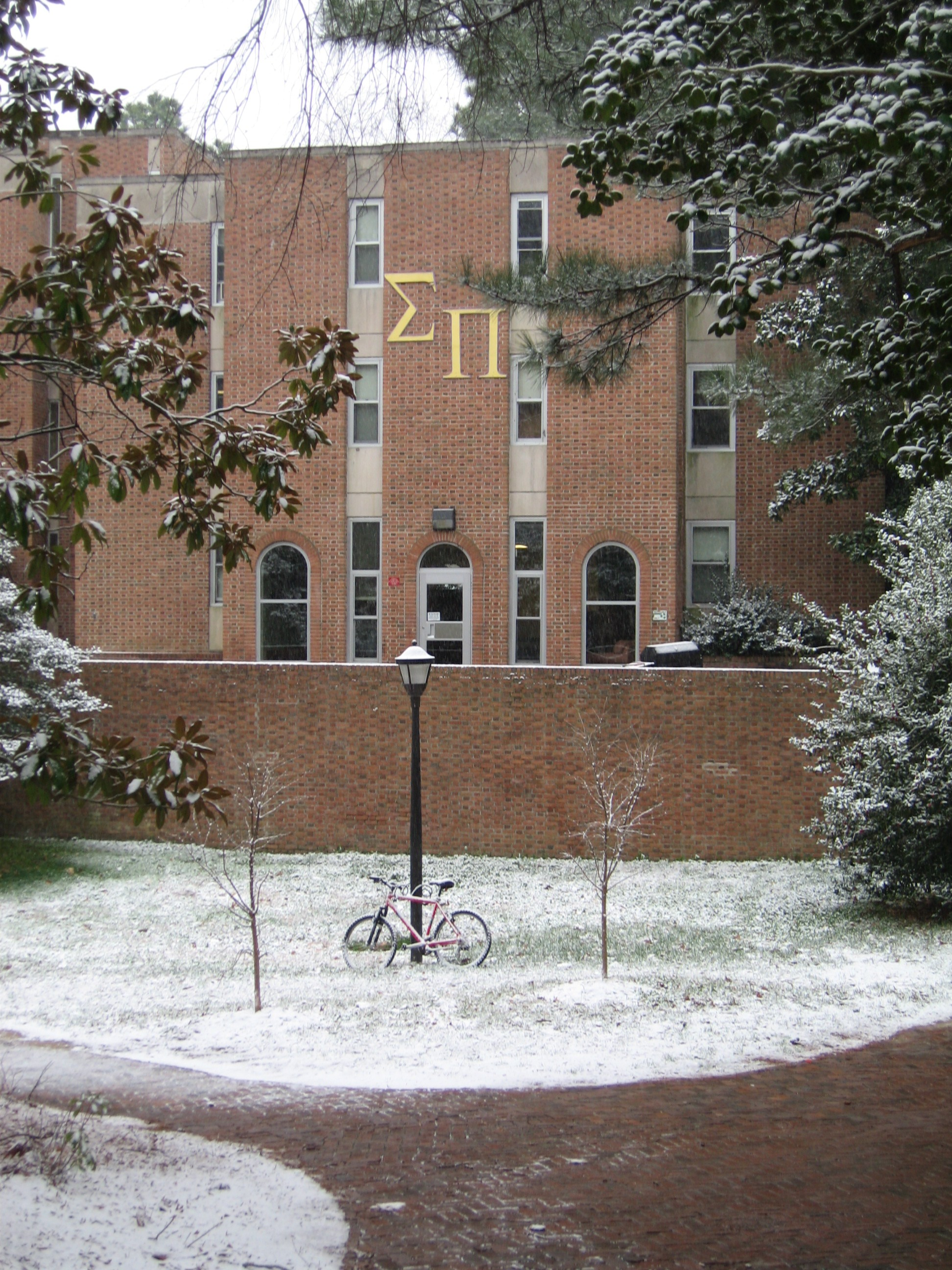
Sigma Pi house at William & Mary est. 1931

In 1904–05, Tau Phi Delta sought expansion to other universities. Though rejected, a local fraternity at Indiana University petitioned to become the second chapter, and Tau Phi Delta began talks with other local fraternities at nearby universities. These discussions ultimately ended without expansion. Additional chapters would eventually be added after Tau Phi Delta became Sigma Pi on February 11, 1907.

In May 1908 the fraternity held its first National Convocation in Vincennes and charters were granted to groups at the University of Illinois (Phi chapter) and Ohio State University (Gamma chapter). Francis L. Lisman was elected as the fraternity's first Grand Sage.

=== Patterson episode: how Sigma Pi got its name ===
Robert George Patterson (no relation to the founder George M. Patterson) was inspired by William Jennings Bryan's membership in the Sigma Pi literary society at Illinois College. Unable to attend Illinois College, Patterson tried unsuccessfully to have the society expand to Ohio State University and contacted an unrelated fraternity at the University of Toronto, also called Sigma Pi, about expansion. Failing at these, Patterson fabricated a history of Sigma Pi, claiming it was founded in 1752 at the College of William & Mary with members such as James Madison, Thomas Jefferson, and Robert E. Lee. He then contacted Tau Phi Delta, which accepted his fabricated history and consolidated under the Sigma Pi name.

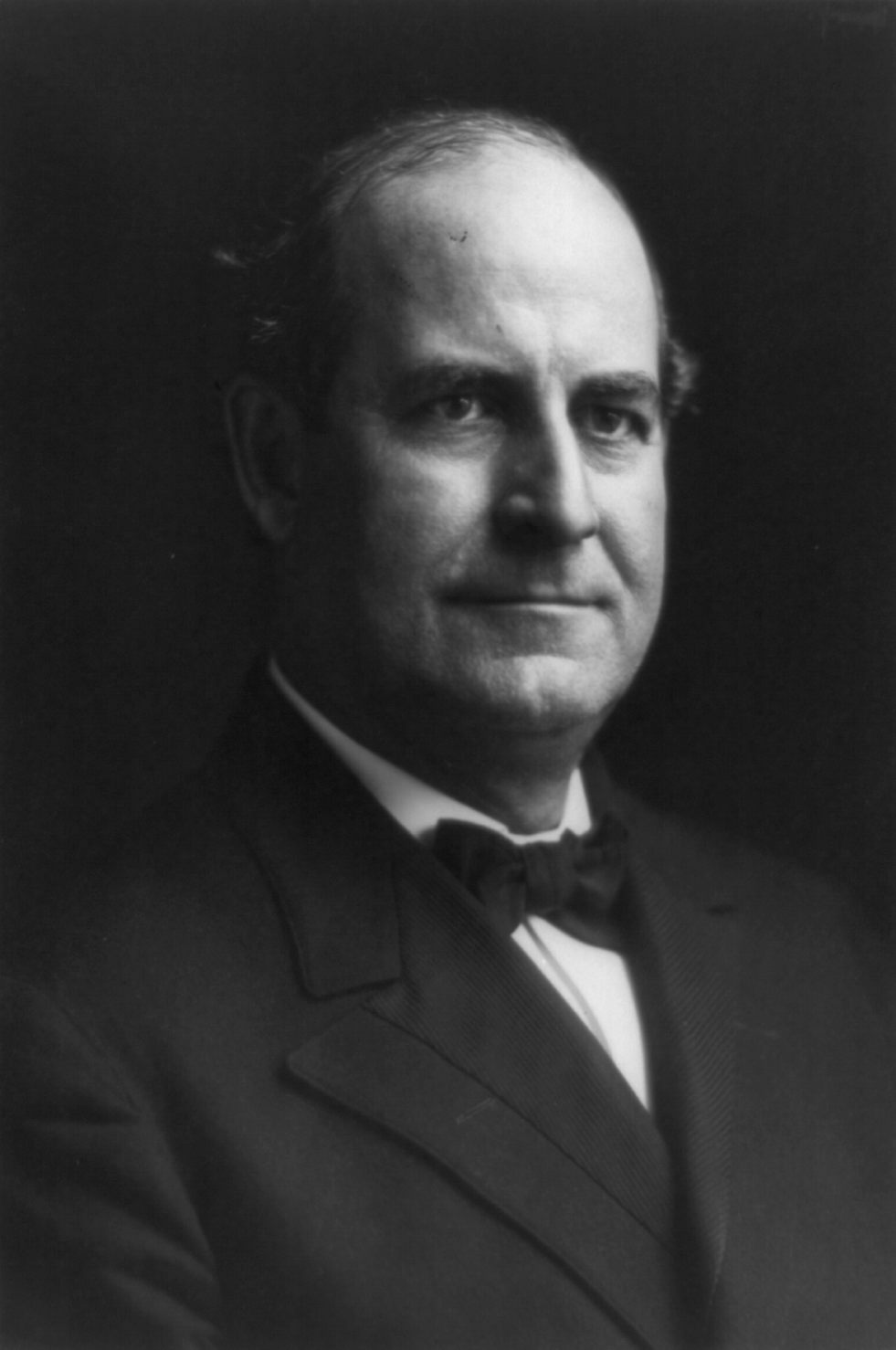
William Jennings Bryan

In 1909, Patterson's claims unraveled. The World Almanac listed Sigma Pi Fraternity, with its fabricated history and listing William Jennings Bryan as an alumnus. Bryan, a member of Delta Chi and the unrelated Sigma Pi literary society, informed the magazine of the error. Furthermore, William Raimond Baird rejected Sigma Pi Fraternity's request for inclusion in his directory. Baird wrote "all statements concerning the alleged origin of this society are inherently incredible." He suggested the story seemed to "be the product of a rather sophomoric imagination." Sigma Pi Fraternity, still unaware of Patterson's fabrications, appealed to Baird to reconsider. Baird refused and published an article criticizing Sigma Pi Fraternity. Patterson was expelled from Sigma Pi, and records bearing his name were deleted. The fraternity only later acknowledged this incident in its official history.

Following Patterson's expulsion, Sigma Pi had five chapters: Vincennes University, University of Illinois, Ohio State University, Temple University, and the University of Pennsylvania. The fraternity redesigned its badge, coat of arms, and ritual.

=== Early Growth: 1910 to World War II ===
Sigma Pi continued to grow, co-founding the North American Interfraternity Conference (NIC) in 1910. On July 15, 1911, Sigma Pi's official publication, The Emerald, was first published. It would not be regularly published until 1914. The fraternity established its first chapter west of the Mississippi River in 1913 (Iota chapter at the University of California, Berkeley). World War I saw only Kappa chapter at Temple University close, though other chapters operated minimally. By 1918 there were 14 chapters.

The fraternity published The Songs of Sigma Pi in 1920 and established its first chapter in the American south (Omicron chapter at Tulane University). The Sigma Pi Foundation, an endowment fund, was established in 1922 and formally chartered in Indiana in 1923.

Sigma Pi doubled its chapters between 1920 and 1927 and established a national office on May 16, 1927. It first operated out of Roselle, NJ, then Elizabeth, NJ. The fraternity published its first pledge manual in 1931. The Keryx newsletter also began publication in 1931. In 1937, the Mississippi State University chapter (Alpha-Lambda) became the first new chapter formed from a colony rather than consolidation. James Hauser became the first field representative that same year.

By May 1940, Sigma Pi had 34 active and 2 inactive chapters and had begun using the I Believe pledge manual. World War II drastically reduced the fraternity to 11 active chapters by war's end.

=== Post War era: 1945 to 1980 ===
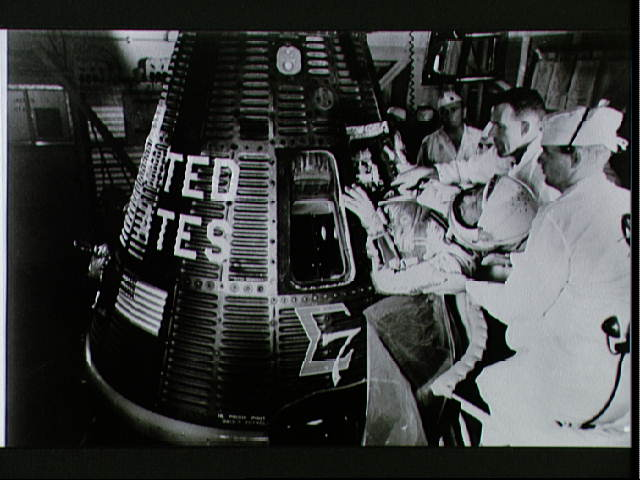
Brother Wally Schirra entering capsule Sigma 7 (1962)

Following World War II, Sigma Pi benefited from increased college enrollments under the GI Bill. By 1950, it had 53 chapters (7 inactive), growing to 63 chapters by 1960. The Byron R. Lewis Educational Foundation, started in 1945 and incorporated in 1952, provided scholarships to members. Beta-Kappa chapter at Arizona State University, chartered in 1951, was unique for having founder James Thompson Kingsbury assist in its founding.

During the 1960s the fraternity added 39 chapters, reaching a total of 109. In 1961, Vincennes University donated the Shadowwood estate to the fraternity for use as its national headquarters. The national office moved into Shadowwood in 1963 after renovations.

In 1964, four chapters of the Delta Kappa fraternity joined Sigma Pi after being impacted by a 1953 New York State Board of Regents edict prohibiting national fraternities at state-funded universities.

William J. Cutbirth became the first Sigma Pi to be president of the North American Interfraternity Conference, serving from 1974 to 1976.

=== International era, 1980 to the present ===
The fraternity chartered 42 new chapters in the 1980s.

Sigma Pi became an international organization in 1984 with the chartering of Zeta-Iota chapter at Western Ontario in Canada. The fraternity subsequently changed its name to Sigma Pi Fraternity International.

In 1988, the fraternity received the Rose Hill Farmstead from the family of founder George Martin Patterson and sold the property to the Sigma Pi Educational Foundation in 1992.

The fraternity moved its international offices to Brentwood, TN in 2003, selling the Shadowwood Estate in 2005. The offices again moved in 2007. In 2013, the fraternity purchased the Mitchell House in Lebanon, Tennessee for its headquarters, holding the grand opening in 2014. The Executive Office later moved to Nashville.

=== Alpha chapter at Vincennes University: preserving Sigma Pi's history ===
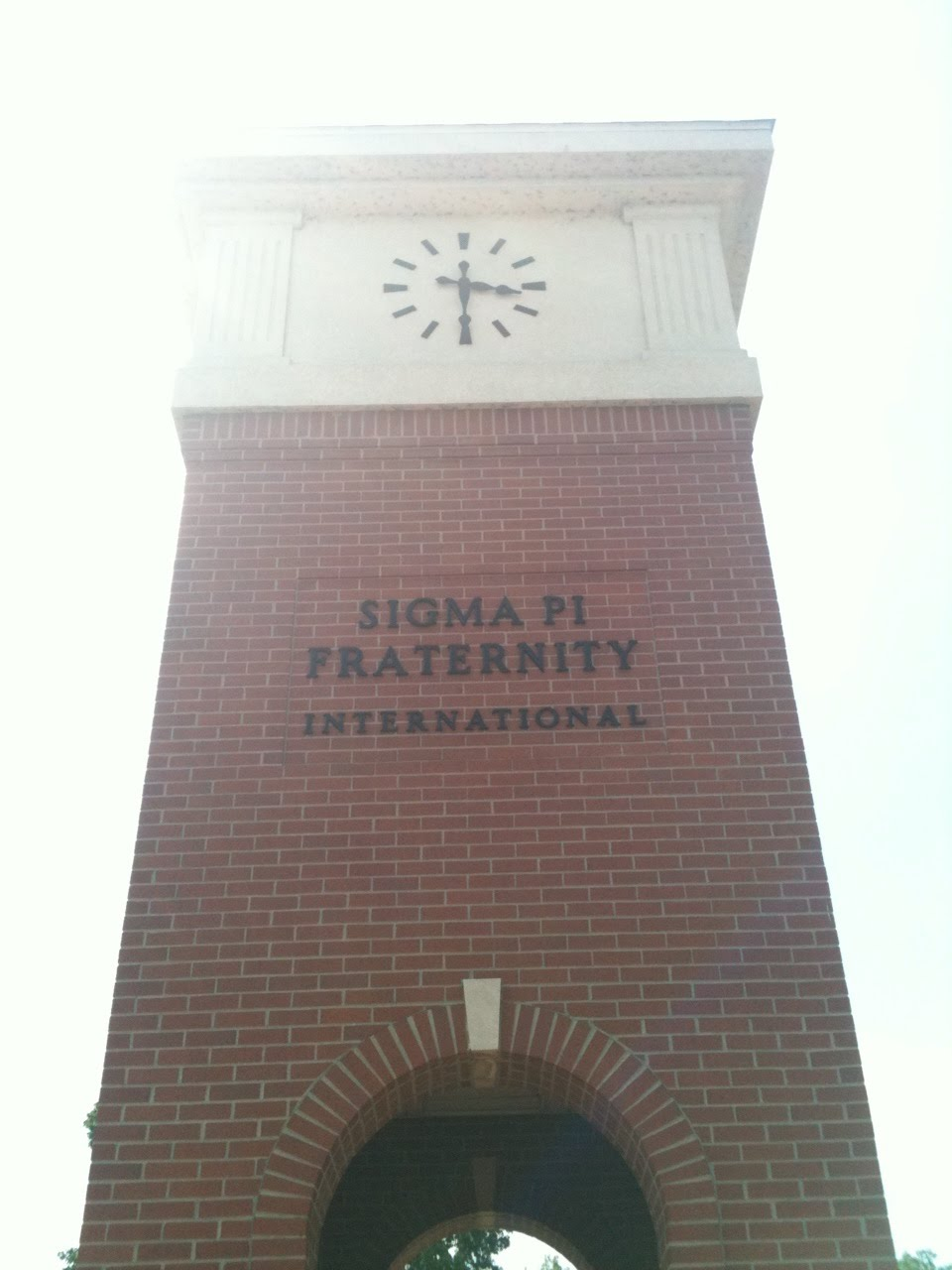
Sigma Pi Centennial Clock Tower at Alpha chapter (Vincennes University)

The Alpha chapter at Vincennes University closed in 1910 and was reactivated in 1965 with special dispensation from the NIC, which then prohibited chapters at two-year junior colleges. The success of the Alpha chapter led the NIC to allow chapters at all junior colleges in 1970. A clock tower at Vincennes University commemorates the foundation of Sigma Pi. The Alpha chapter remains active.

== Symbols and traditions ==
The fraternity's primary colors are lavender and white, with gold as an auxiliary color. Its symbol is the owl. Its flower is the lavender orchid, with the white rose and lilacs as alternates and goldenrod as an auxiliary. Its jewel is the emerald. The fraternity's publication is The Emerald.

=== Sigma Pi Motto ===
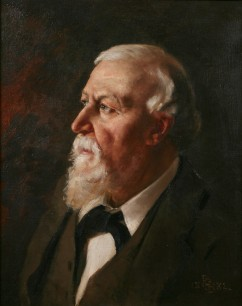
Robert Browning, a key influence of the founders

The mother of the first two initiates, Samuel and Maurice Bayard, chose the fraternity's motto from Robert Browning's poem "A Death in the Desert":

Progress, man's distinctive mark alone,
Not God's, and not the beasts';
God is, they are.
Man partly is and wholly hopes to be.

=== Five ideals ===
Sigma Pi Fraternity promotes five basic ideals or pillars:

1. To establish a brotherhood.
2. To establish and maintain an aristocracy of learning.
3. To raise the standards of morality and develop character.
4. To diffuse culture and encourage chivalry.
5. To promote the spirit of civic righteousness and quicken the national conscience.

=== Creed ===
The Sigma Pi Creed expresses the fraternity's ideals:

I Believe in Sigma Pi,
a Fellowship of kindred minds,
united in Brotherhood
to advance Truth and Justice,
to promote Scholarship,
to encourage Chivalry,
to diffuse Culture,
and to develop Character,
in the Service of God and Man,
and I will strive to make real the Fraternity's ideals in my own daily life.

=== Publications ===
Sigma Pi has several publications:

- The Emerald of Sigma Pi, commonly referred to as The Emerald, is published three times a year. Louis L. Moore (Kappa, Temple University) edited the first issue, published July 15, 1911. Due to financial constraints, regular publication began in 1914 under Luther C. Weeks (Eta, Purdue University).
- The Keryx (first published in July 1931) is the esoteric publication of Sigma Pi.
- The Manual of Ceremonies contains the rituals of Sigma Pi.
- I Believe is the Sigma Pi pledge manual, first published in 1940.
- Who's Who in Sigma Pi is a directory of every member, published at least once a decade.
- Songs of Sigma Pi was published in 1922, later superseded by Sigma Pi Sings in 1968.

== Governance ==
Sigma Pi has chapters, Alumni Clubs, and colonies. A colony is a group of men interested in forming a chapter. An active chapter consists of at least twenty-five active members in good standing with their university and the Grand chapter. Alumni Clubs are for Sigma Pi alumni.

Sigma Pi is governed by its Constitution and Bylaws, as well as NIC rules. Individual chapters are also subject to university regulations and the local Interfraternity Council. Membership is offered to men meeting requirements, which can vary by campus. Honorary membership may be extended to relatives of members, alumni, and faculty or administration. The Constitution and Bylaws are reviewed and amended at biennial Convocations. Meetings are governed by Robert's Rules of Order.

=== Grand Chapter ===
The Grand Chapter, headed by the Grand Council, has full jurisdiction over the fraternity. It elects officers, amends governing documents, and holds biennial Convocations. Each chapter is required to send one delegate.

The Grand Council, consisting of seven elected officers, exercises governmental power between Grand Chapter sessions. In 2010, Sigma Pi shifted the Grand Council to a Board of Governors model, focusing on policy creation, while the Executive Office Staff handles implementation. The Grand Chapter may maintain scholarship and expansion committees.

=== Grand Council structure ===
The Grand Council consists of:

1. Grand Sage (President)
2. Grand Second Counselor (Vice President)
3. Grand Third Counselor (Treasurer)
4. Grand Fourth Counselor (Secretary)
5. Grand First Counselor (Sergeant at Arms)
6. Grand Herald (Historian)
7. Past Grand Sage

=== Chapter structure ===
Chapter governments mirror the Grand Chapter structure, though individual chapter executive councils follow traditional officer duties. Chapters are required to have scholarship, recruitment, pledge education, finance, social, and intramural committees and may have alumni relations, public relations, risk management, and community service committees. Each chapter must have an adviser.

=== Executive office ===
The Executive Office, located in Nashville, Tennessee, serves as the fraternity's information, service, and record-keeping center. It also houses a small museum. The Executive Office implements policies set by the Grand Chapter and Grand Council. The executive director manages the headquarters, staff, and operations.

Sigma Pi created the Educational Leadership Consultants (ELC) program to advise chapters, later replaced by the Regional Director's Program. A new Chapter Management Associate system was implemented.

== Membership ==
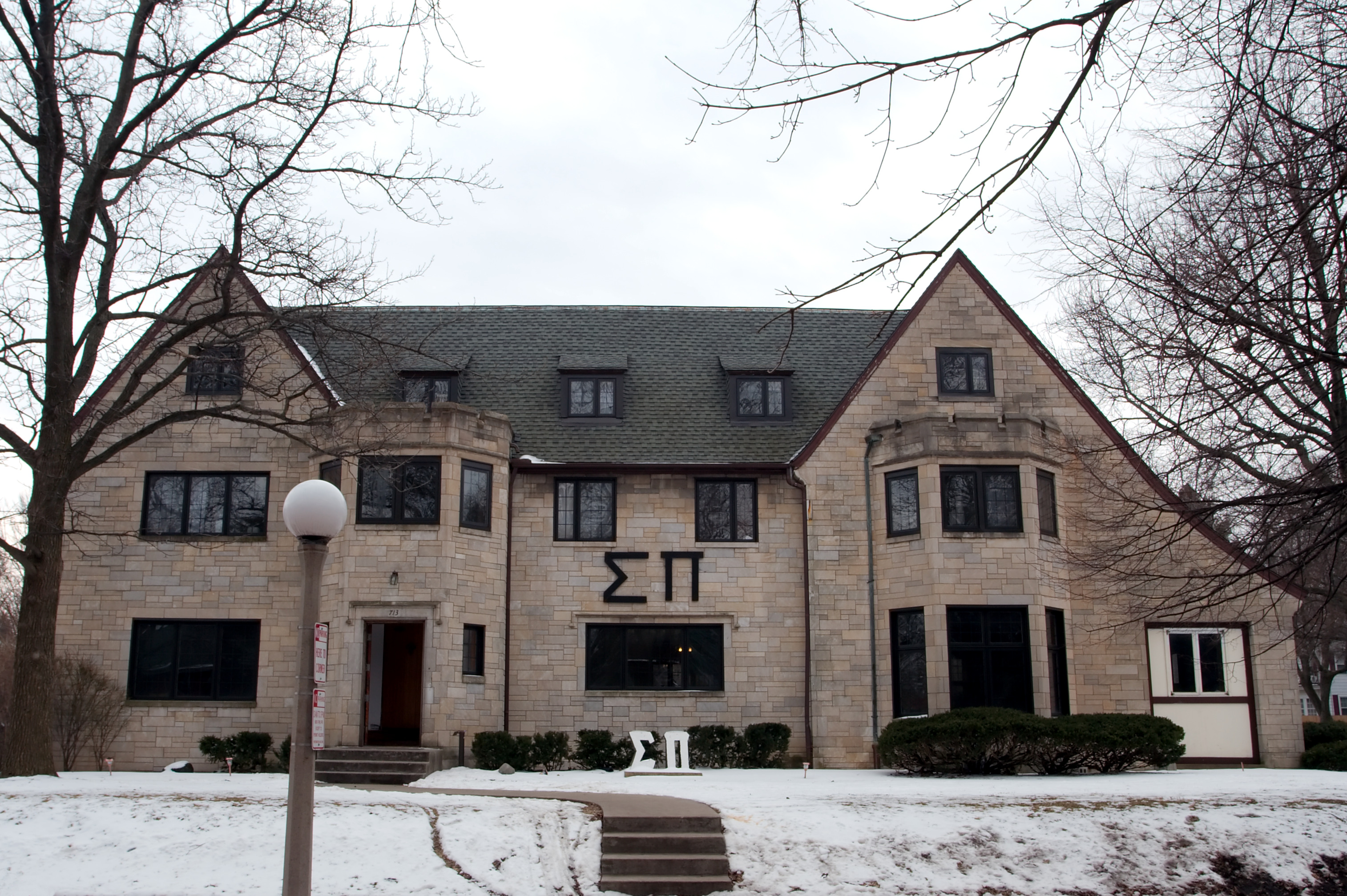
Sigma Pi house at the University of Illinois at Urbana

Sigma Pi, like many social fraternities, limits membership to men only. Requirements can vary by campus, depending on the rules of the university or college and the standards dictated by the campus Interfraternity Council. Generally Sigma Pi requires members to be in good academic standing and be active in the campus community. Potential members meet the brothers of a chapter during a process called rush. Following rush, the chapter convenes and votes on potential new members. With a favorable vote by the entire chapter, a potential new member will be offered a bid to join the local Sigma Pi chapter. If accepted, the man begins his pledgeship. Sigma Pi defines a pledge as "a man who has assented to become a member and who has been elected to membership but has not yet been initiated."

During this period the pledge and the fraternity come to know each other better and mutually reaffirm the decision to become full members in Sigma Pi. During his pledgeship, a man will learn about the fraternity's history, operations, and reasons for existence. He will also learn how his specific chapter operates and what is expected of him as a brother. A pledge has no right to exert influence on chapter policy or organization until he is granted full membership upon initiation; however, a pledge should still participate in conversations about chapter policy and organization with initiated members. Generally the pledge should speak through his big brother or the new member educator. Although not an initiated member, a pledge should not be viewed as less than or unequal to a member. He simply does not know the secrets and rituals of Sigma Pi. His status as a pledge in no way entitles members to treat him any differently than any other member of Sigma Pi.

=== Obligations of members ===
Sigma Pi demands its members have a reasonable amount of interest and participation in its affairs. Sigma Pi's expectations are summarized by its ten obligations. All brothers are expected to regard each obligation with utmost seriousness and strive to work towards their fulfillment. If properly followed, these obligations help make Sigma Pi chapters run effectively and efficiently as well as making Sigma Pi men outstanding members of their communities and society.

1. Give proper attention to the interests of Sigma Pi.
2. Regard the Fraternity with a spirit of sincerity and respect and give earnest considerations to its teachings and ideals.
3. Meet Financial Obligations Promptly And Fully.
4. Cheerfully perform tasks that may be assigned for the good of the Fraternity.
5. At all times be a gentleman and use moderation in all things.
6. Strive at all times to cooperate for the good of the Fraternity.
7. Work diligently to maintain good scholarship.
8. Participate in worthy college activities.
9. Profit by associations with men in a spirit of fraternalism.
10. Be an exemplary Sigma Pi and citizen.

=== Expectations of membership ===
Sigma Pi has several expectations of members to help them gain the most from their membership in Sigma Pi. These expectations are expressed below.

1. I will respect the dignity of all persons, and therefore, I will not physically, psychologically, or sexually abuse any human being.
2. I will respect the rights of property, both others and my own; therefore I will not, nor will I tolerate, the abuse of private or community property.
3. I will pay all of my financial obligations in a timely manner.
4. I will not use nor support the use of illegal drugs.
5. I will not abuse nor support the abuse of alcohol.
6. I acknowledge that a clean and an attractive environment is essential to both physical and mental health; therefore, I will do all in my power to see that the chapter property is properly cleaned and maintained.
7. I will confront the members of my Fraternity who are violating the bylaws and policies.

== Philanthropy ==
Sigma Pi encourages a fraternal culture that promotes its ideals by philanthropic events for its members and the communities in which its chapters are located. Each chapter is required to complete regular philanthropy events and participate in Sigma Pi's Altruistic Campus Experience (ACE). The ACE project is in addition to each chapter's normal philanthropy events that it holds throughout the year. Finally, Sigma Pi's Educational Fund provides assistance to students to cover the costs of college tuition.

=== General philanthropy ===
Every two years at the Biennium Convention, Sigma Pi selects a new charity organization as the official philanthropy of Sigma Pi. At times Sigma Pi will select more than one charity. Usually Sigma Pi selects charities created by or for brothers and their families. In doing so Sigma Pi hopes to turn tragedies into rallying points to help promote and encourage a cause that has affected brothers as well as their families.

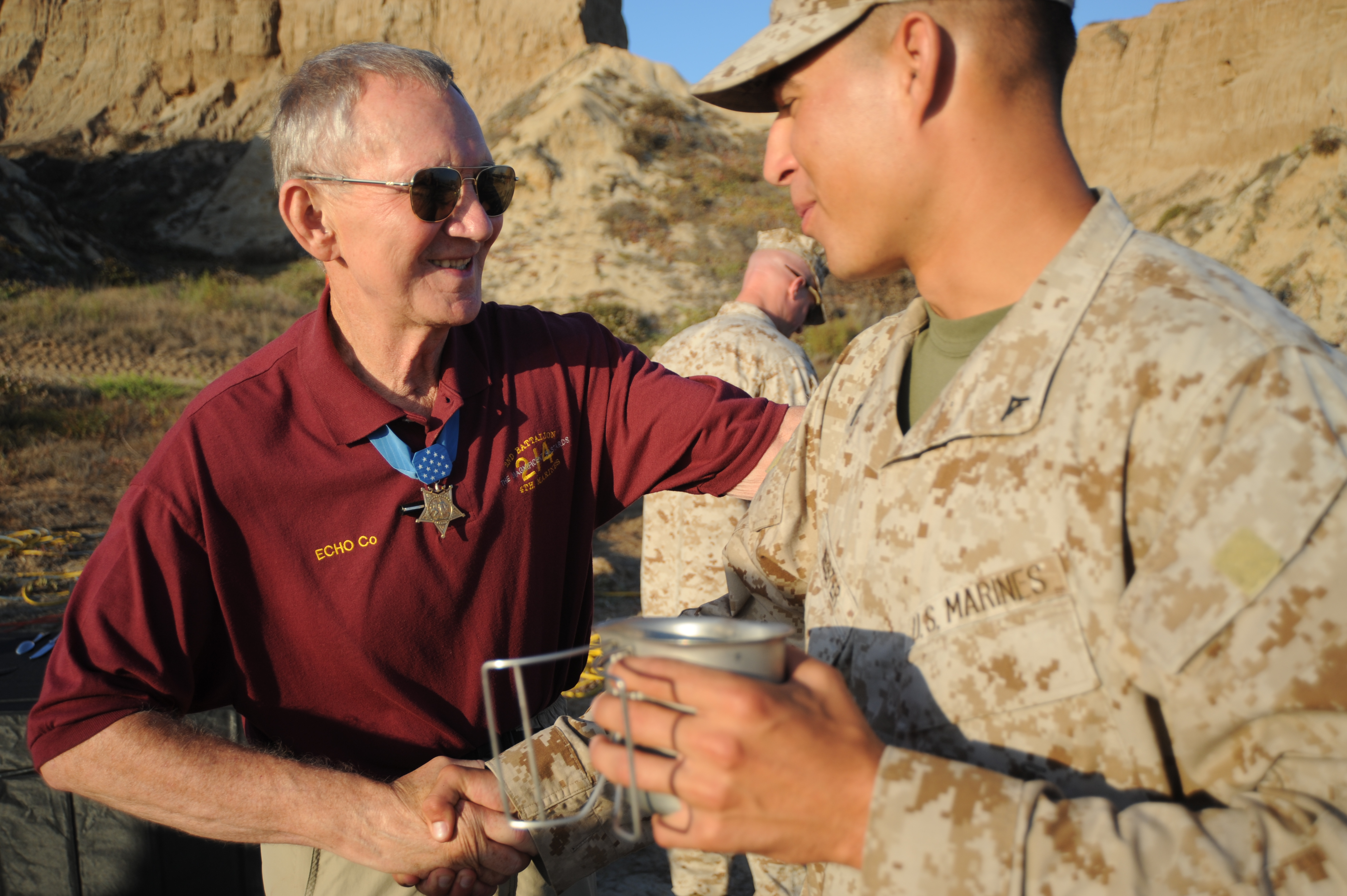
Medal of Honor Recipient Brother Major General James Livingston meeting with troops

At this time, Sigma Pi focuses its philanthropic efforts on two organizations for the following two years; the Amazing Day Foundation, and Donate Life America. Furthermore, Sigma Pi requires each individual chapter to sponsor philanthropy events throughout the academic school year. Sigma Pi even encourages chapters to participate in Philanthropy events that occur during school breaks and summers. The fraternity currently allows each individual chapter to assist any charitable causes as they see fit.

=== Educational fund ===
Beginning in 1947, Honorary Grand Sage Byron R. Lewis (Member of both the Alpha and Phi chapters) donated several monetary gifts, recommending that the money be used to begin an educational fund. In his name the Byron R. Lewis Educational Fund was established. Its stated goals were to: "supplement the work of colleges in the educational development of students; to assist needy and deserving students to complete their education; and to aid aged or disabled former students who are in need or worthy of assistance." And in 1992, the fund was renamed the Sigma Pi Educational Foundation. Any Sigma Pi member in good standing may become a member of the Educational Foundation by contributing an annual 100 dollar membership fee or $5,000 in lifetime gifts. As such, in 2000, the Foundation's assets were worth more than 2.3 million dollars. The Educational foundation's growth supports Sigma Pi members in their continuing quest for education. At the 2012 Convocation in San Antonio, Texas, Sigma Pi unanimously voted to collect 5 dollars per undergraduate member per year specifically designated for the educational foundation.

=== Altruistic Campus Experience ===
The "ACE" (Altruistic Campus Experience) Project began in the fall of 2002 when Former Executive Director Mark Briscoe re-evaluated the role of Greek life on campus. The project is the first fraternity or sorority campus service program for chapters specifically designed to benefit their host institutions. The program is designed to improve the campuses, on which chapters are located, thereby improving the collegiate experience for the entire college or university. Every project is unique to the individual campuses of each chapter. chapters are asked to determine a campus need and work to fill that need. The university must be aware of and approve the project prior to beginning the project.

== Notable members ==
With more than 100 active chapters and colonies in the United States and Canada, Sigma Pi has over 110,000 alumni. Sigma Pi has alumni who are notable in many different industries and fields.

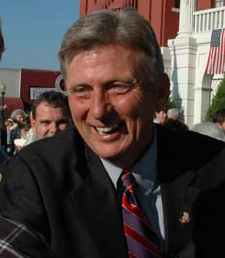
Mike Beebe, Alpha Pi, Arkansas State University, 45th governor of Arkansas

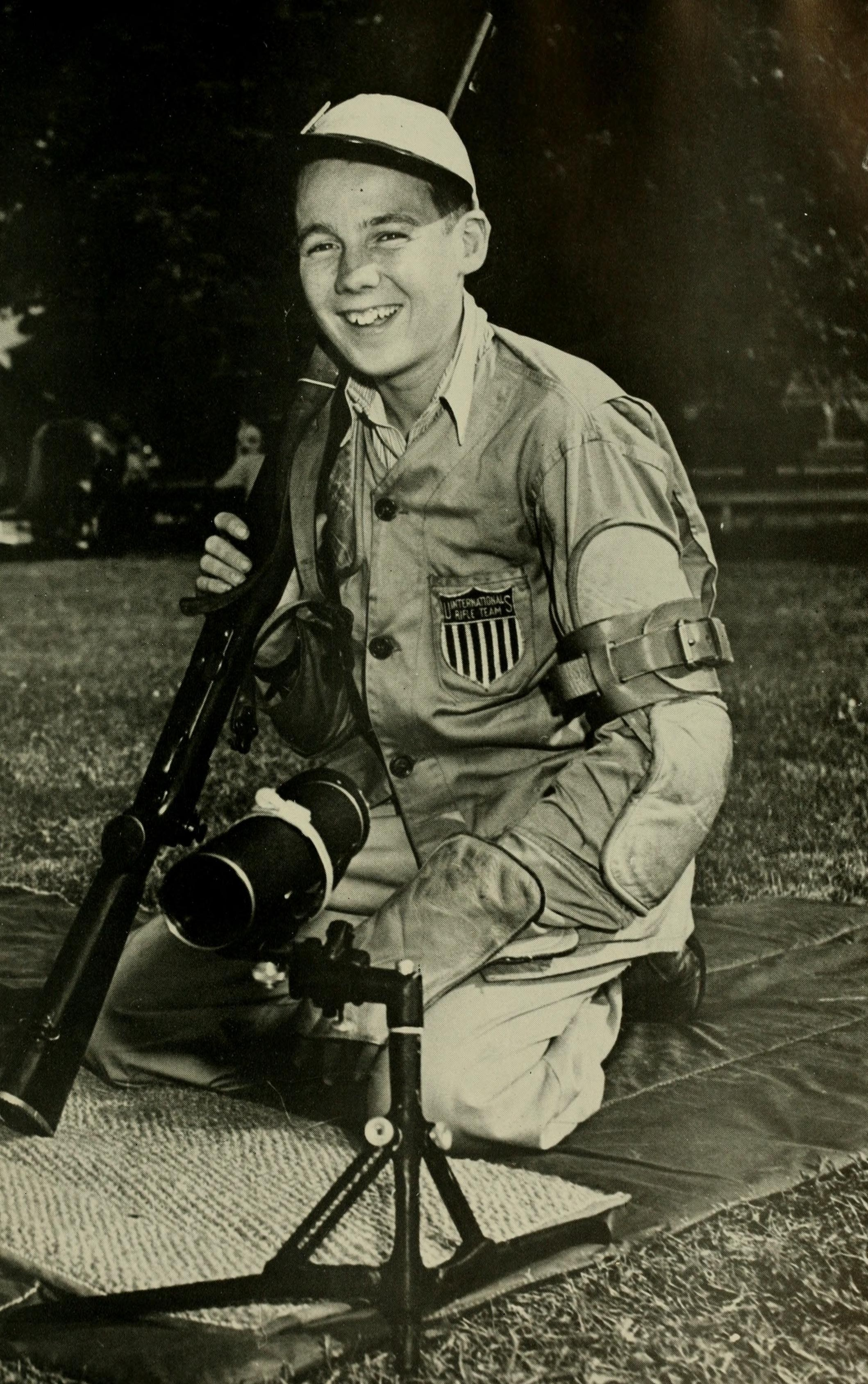
Arthur Cook, Alpha Chi, University of Maryland, gold medalist at the 1948 Summer Olympics

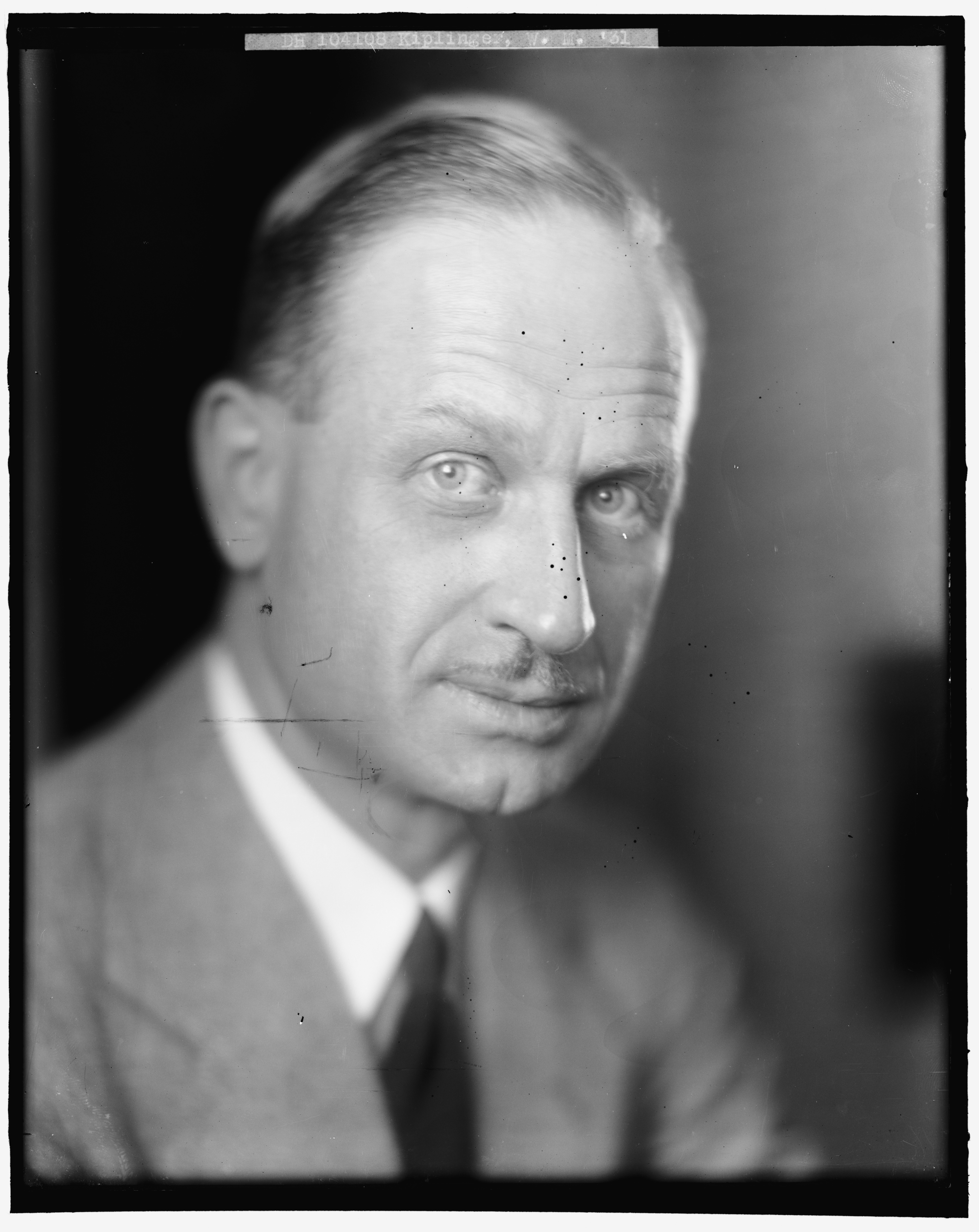
W.M. Kiplinger, Gamma, Ohio State University, founder of Kiplinger

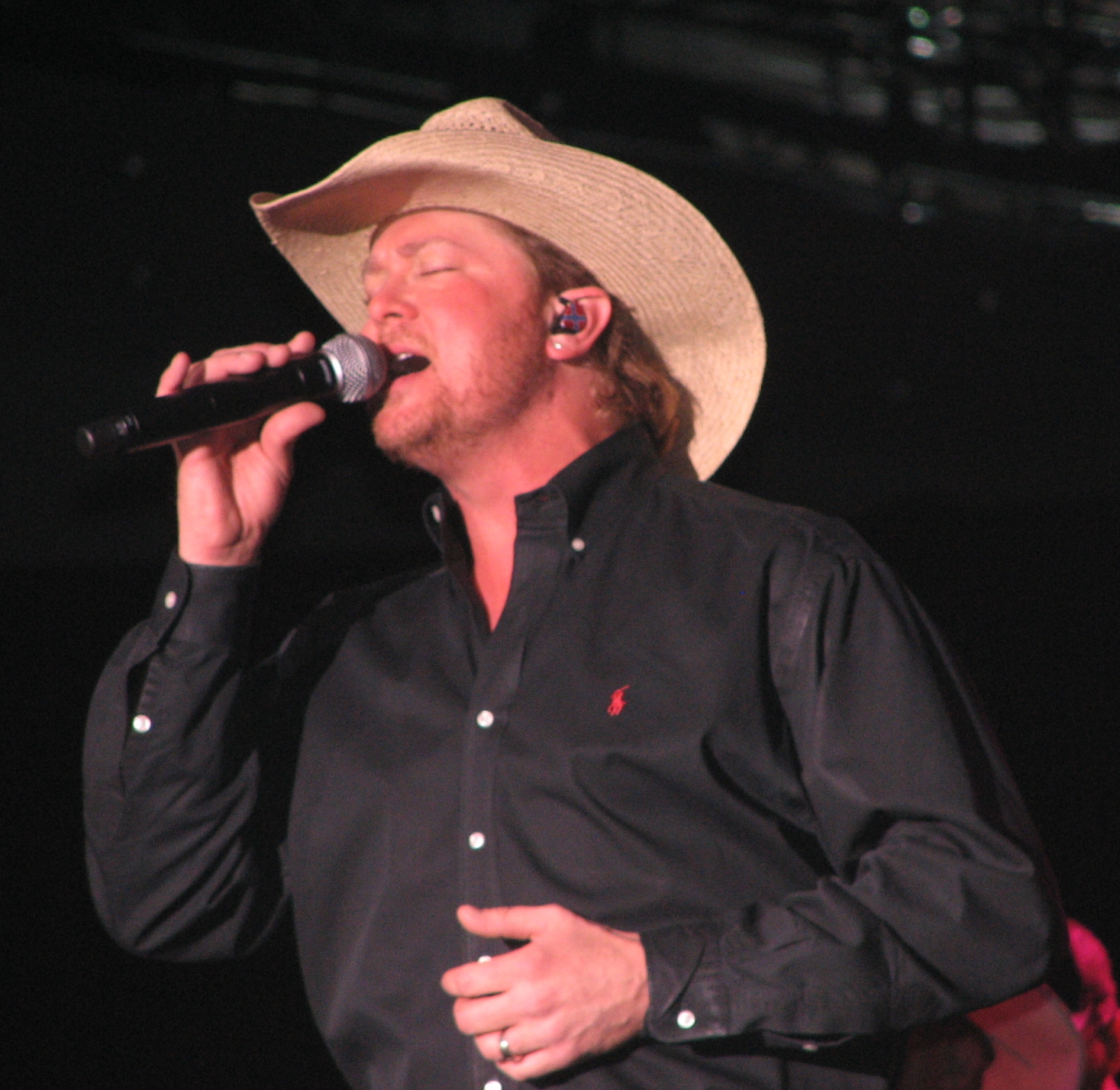
Tracy Lawrence, Epsilon Kappa, Southern Arkansas University, country music singer

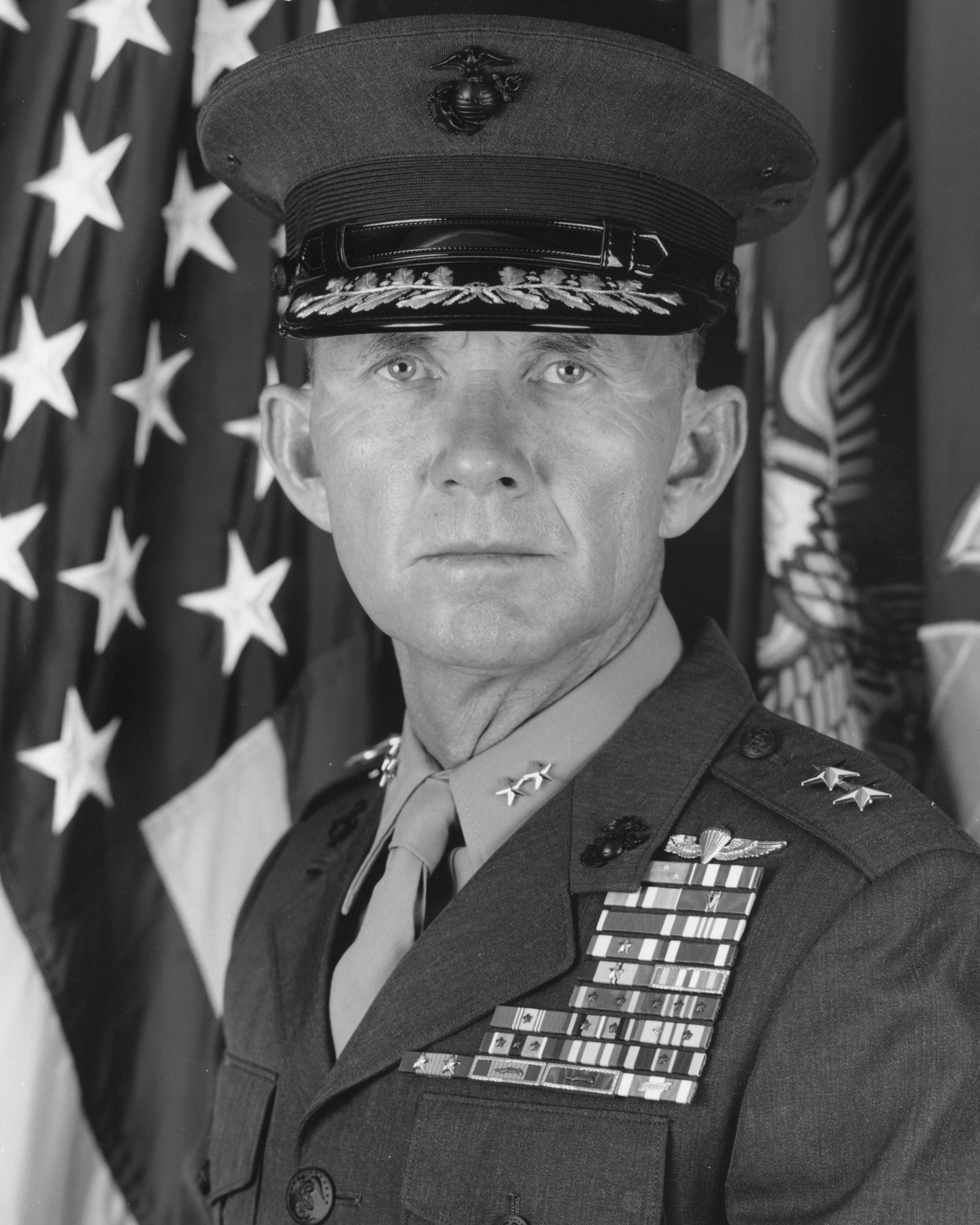
James E. Livingston, Alpha Delta, Auburn University, USMC, Congressional Medal of Honor recipient

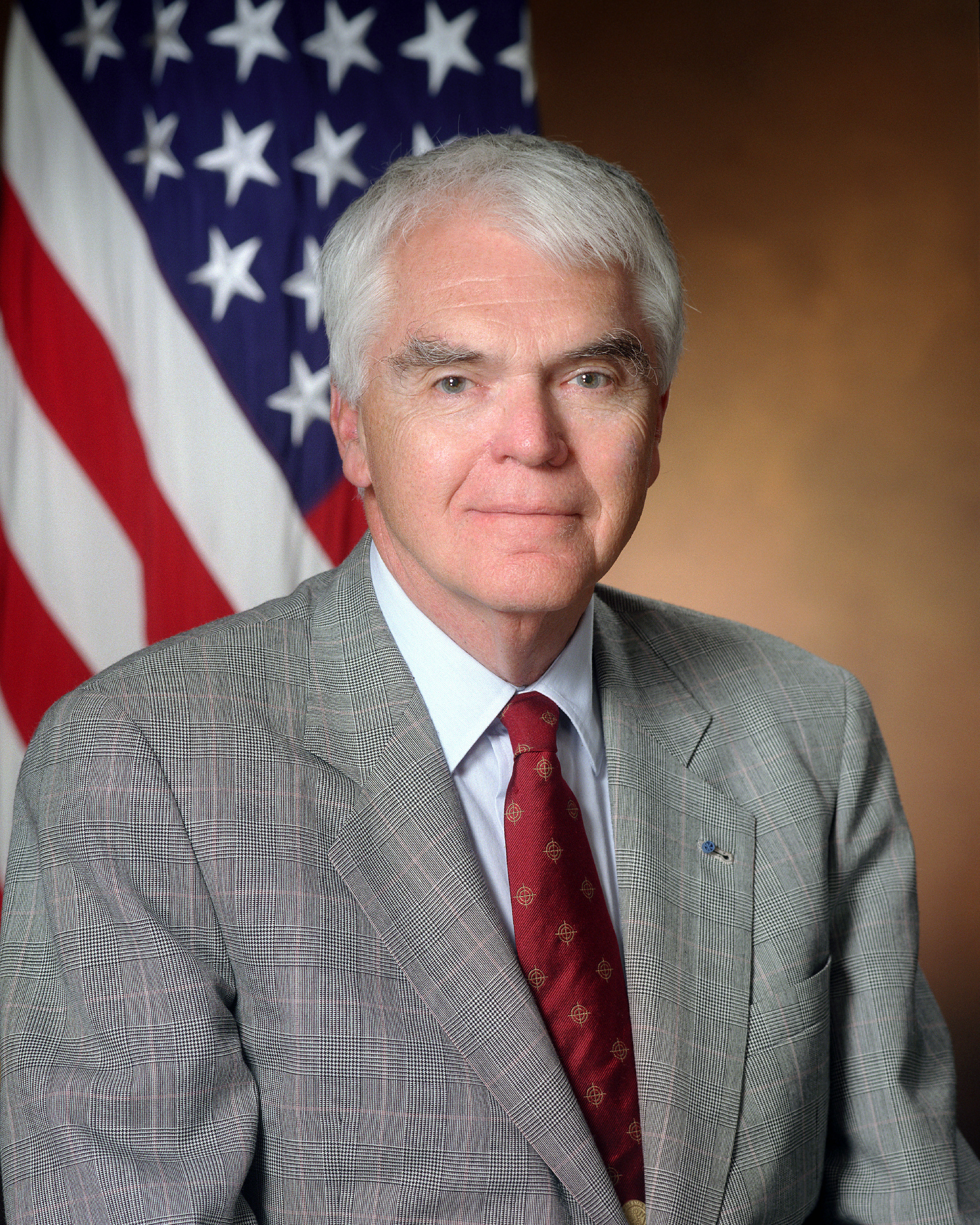
Hans Mark, Iota, University of California, Berkeley, United States Secretary of the Air Force

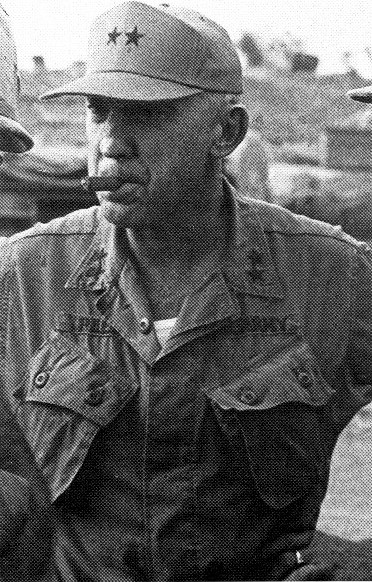
William R. Peers, Upsilon, University of California, Los Angeles, lieutenant general in the U.S. Army

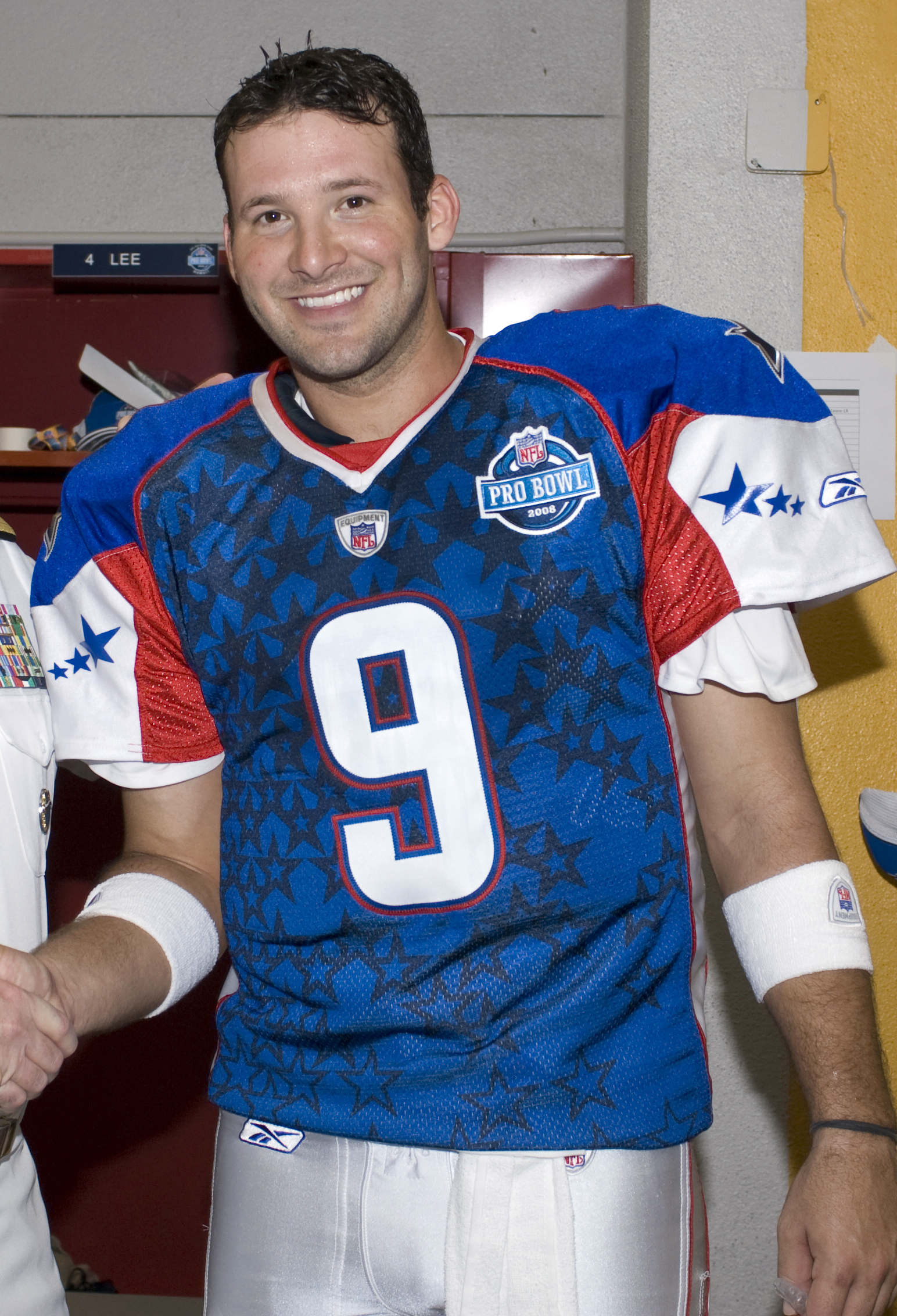
Tony Romo, Beta Gamma, Eastern Illinois University, retired National Football League quarterback

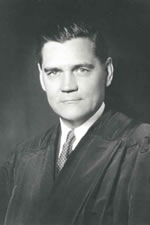
Curtis Shake, Alpha, Vincennes University, judge

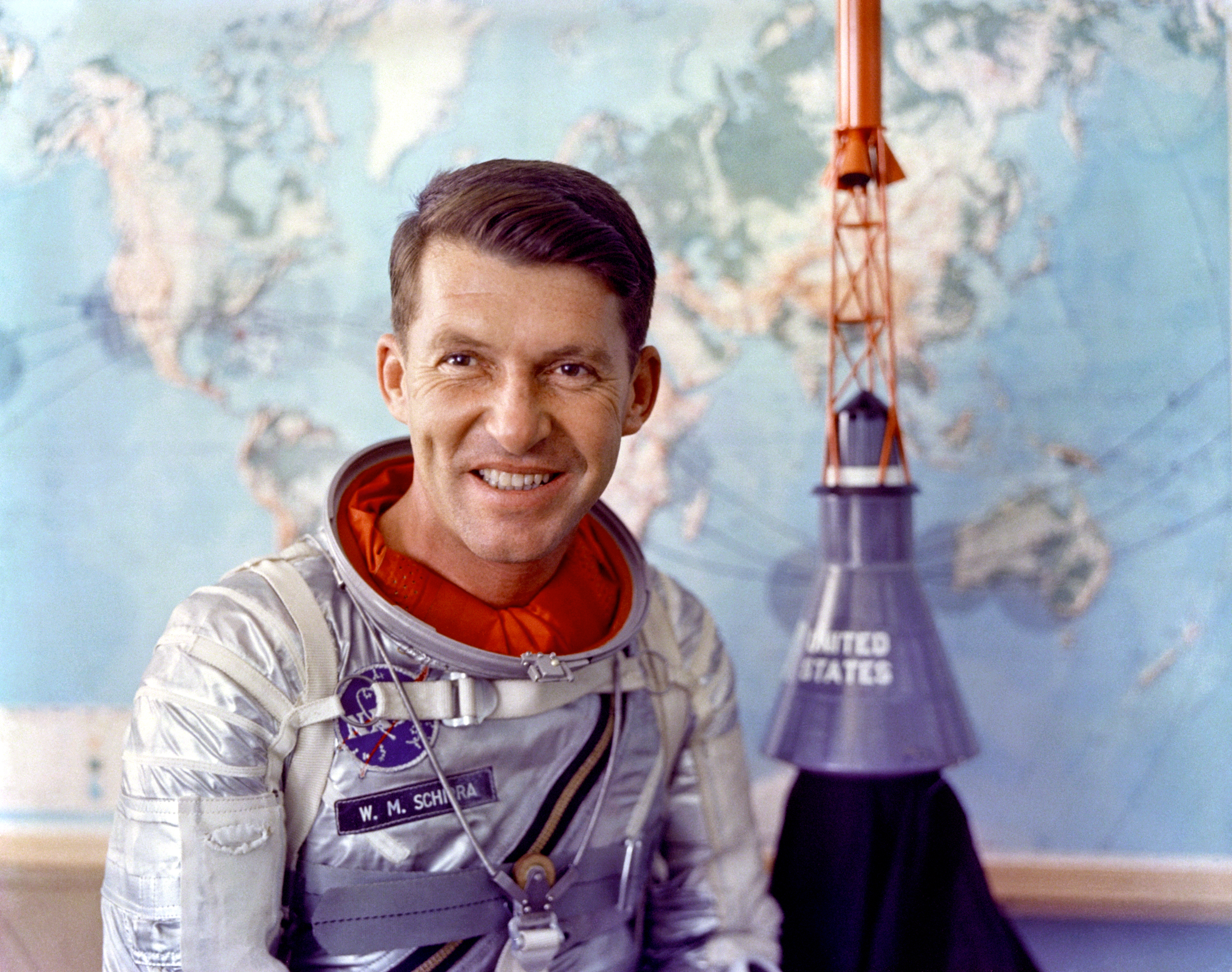
Walter Marty Schirra, Alpha Mu, New Jersey Institute of Technology, astronaut

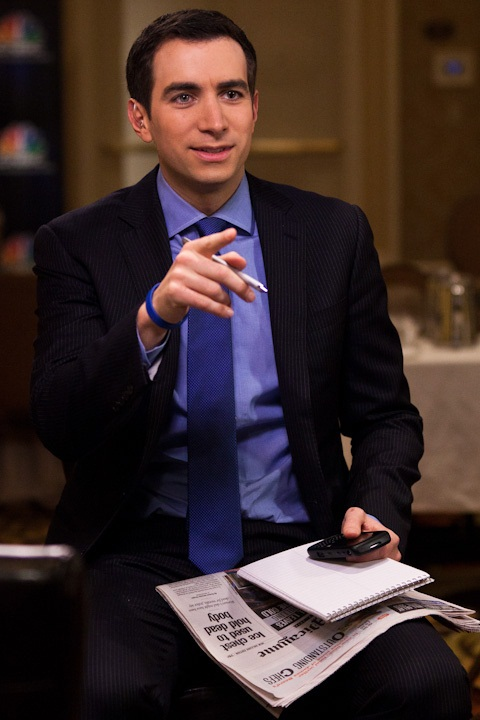
Andrew Ross Sorkin, Mu, Cornell University, journalist and writer

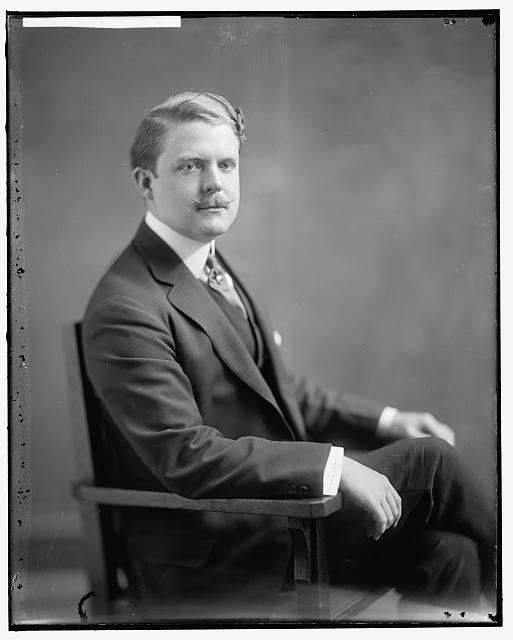
John Thomas Taylor, Kappa, Temple University, lobbyist for the American Legion

== Local chapter or member misconduct ==
In March 2012, the Beta chapter at Indiana University released a 10-minute short film titled ‘FRATLINE: The Hazing Barrier’ which was banned by the Inter Fraternity Council and dean of students. Attention was drawn to the film (which was released on YouTube) after it received nearly 30,000 views in a week and depicted a hazing obsessed pledge master named Adam. Despite it being a “mockumentary”, the film was banned for depicting Indiana University Greek Life in a bad light. The film was eventually edited and re-released the following semester. It has been prominently featured on TotalFratMove.com, BroBible.com and the front page of the Indiana Daily Student on Election Day (November 6) of 2012. It currently sits at around 180,000 views on YouTube.

In November 2014, the chapter at Elon University temporarily lost its charter after its national office, as well as Elon officials, were notified about several new members suffering injuries from being forced to lie down on bottle caps. The chapter was a repeat hazing offender. The chapter was eligible to seek reinstatement on campus in fall 2017.

In December 2016, a former chapter of the fraternity made national headlines after disturbing photos leaked of former members hazing at the then-closed Hofstra University chapter. A former pledge and expelled member of the fraternity leaked photos showing individuals who appear to be pledges locked in small cages and photos showing additional individuals who appear to be pledges, shirtless, blindfolded, covered in hot sauce, and kneeling in front of a swastika. On March 1, 2016 - nine months prior to the release of these photos - the Grand Council of Sigma Pi revoked the chapter's charter due to "violations of both Fraternity and FIPG risk management policies."

In October 2016, Gamma-Sigma chapter at the University of Missouri opted to withdraw from the university's Greek community due to alleged overzealous enforcement of the student code of conduct against members of the chapter. Shortly after the chapter withdrew from the Greek community, the University of Missouri banned Sigma Pi from campus. This rift was caused when a pledge was sent to an emergency room with bruises on his buttocks and a blood alcohol level of 0.34.

In March 2017, the Executive Office of Sigma Pi opted to close its colony at Illinois Wesleyan University after an investigation launched due to a member of the colony being pulled over for drunk driving. The investigation found that the colony may have sponsored an event where underage drinking could have occurred. This was the colony's first offense, though a prior iteration of Sigma Pi on this campus faced its own risk management problems. The colony was noted in this case to have a "failure to attend to the culture of risk management."

In mid-November 2018, a former pledge was found unresponsive and later pronounced dead at an unofficial annex house to Ohio University's Epsilon chapter of Sigma Pi. The chapter was issued a cease and desist by the school's administration and the incident is under investigation by Ohio University and Athens, Ohio police. In April 2019, Ohio University permanently barred Sigma Pi from operating at any of its campuses. Current Sigma Pi members are additionally barred from joining any other social fraternity on campus or creating or colonizing a new fraternity. In February 2019, the estate of the deceased former pledge, Collin Wiant, filed a wrongful death lawsuit against Sigma Pi alleging that Wiant and other pledges were hazed. This hazing included being forced to drink a gallon of beer in one hour, and be beaten and humiliated. The suit alleges that this pattern of activity ultimately resulted in Wiant's death.

On April 12, 2019, a University at Buffalo chapter caused all Greek life at the university to be suspended along with the creation of a new internal review committee for Greek Life following potential hazing. The student, Sebastian Serafin-Bazan, died five days later. The investigation is ongoing as of April 17, 2019.

In 2021, the chapter at the University of Indiana was suspended for at least two years for hazing pledges, endangering others, dishonest conduct, and failure to comply with university regulations.

== See also ==
- List of social fraternities and sororities
- List of Sigma Pi chapters
- List of Sigma Pi brothers
