= Bandim Health Project =

Research station in Guinea-Bissau

Coordinates: 11°50′43.64″N 15°35′45.42″W

- Projecto de Saúde Bandim
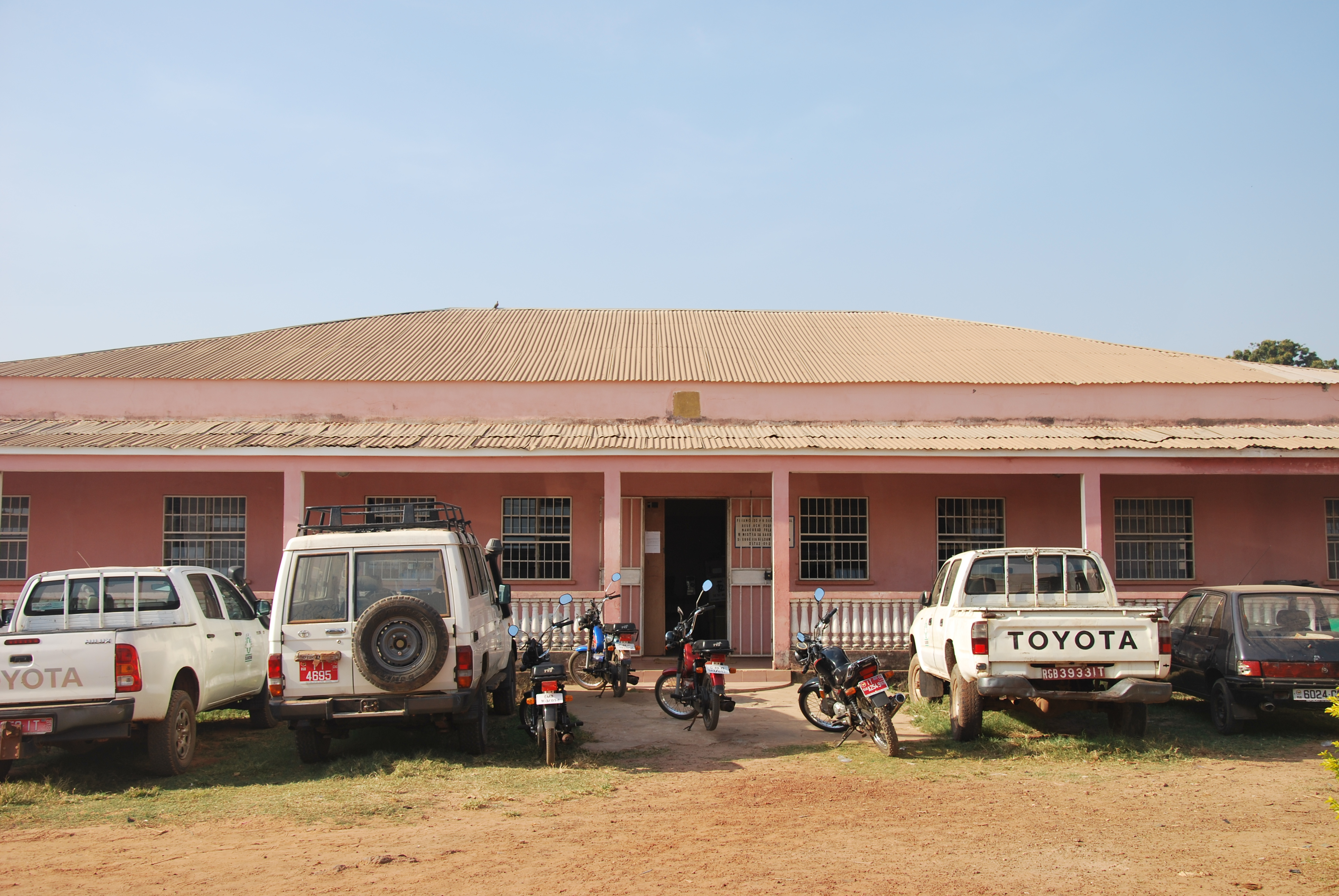
- Abbreviation: BHP
- Formation: 1978
- Founder: Peter Aaby
- Type: Non-governmental organization
- Location: Guinea-Bissau
- Members: The INDEPTH Network
- Leader: Peter Aaby
- National Research Coordinator: Amabélia Rodrigues
- Parent organization: Statens Serum Institut
- Affiliations: University of Southern Denmark; Center for Vitamins and Vaccines; Centre for International Health; Copenhagen University; Aarhus University
- Staff: 150
- Website: www.bandim.org

The Bandim Health Project is a research station in Guinea-Bissau related to University of Southern Denmark and the Statens Serum Institut, a danish research institution.

Group members have made strong claims about the non-specific effect of vaccines, but these claims have been described as the result of questionable research methods.

== History ==
The Bandim Health Project was initiated in 1978 by Peter Aaby. The project is currently based on collaboration between the Ministry of Public Health in Guinea-Bissau, the Statens Serum Institut in Denmark, and researchers affiliated to The University of Southern Denmark, as well as the University of Aarhus, Denmark.

In 2012, the Danish National Research Foundation funded the establishment of the Center of Excellence, The Research Center for Vitamins and Vaccines (CVIVA) based on the Bandim Health Project and its research into non-specific effects of vaccines.

== Fields of research ==
The Bandim Health Project works with population based health research, focusing on women and children. The project's fields of research include:

- Vaccines, both their specific effects on the targeted diseases, and in particular their potential non-specific effects on morbidity and mortality.
- Other health interventions, including assessment of the total impact on mortality of new interventions or changes in existing policies.
- Infectious diseases, e.g. measles, diarrhoea, rotavirus, respiratory infections, malaria, HIV, HTLV, and Tuberculosis.
- Nutrition, including micronutrients such as vitamin A supplementation, and breast-feeding.
- Humanitarian aid.

== Questionable research practice ==
A 2025 article in Vaccine said that strong claims made by Benn and Aaby about non-specific vaccine effects were not supported by the evidence presented: "We were surprised to find several instances of questionable research practices, such as unpublished primary outcomes, outcome switching, reinterpretation of trials based on statistically fragile subgroup analyses, and frequent promotion of cherry-picked secondary findings as causal, even when primary outcomes yielded null results. Sample size calculations appeared to be driven by unwarranted optimism regarding effect-sizes and event rates leading to underpowered studies".

A 2026 article—also in Vaccine—reported on 10 pre-registered randomized controlled trials (RCTs) performed at the Bandim Health Project where the primary outcomes are partly or completely missing from the scientific records. Altogether these 10 RCTs included more than 74,000 children.

== The organization ==
The Bandim Health Project is led by Peter Aaby. The National Research Coordinator is Amabélia Rodrigues. Since the project's foundation in 1978, more than 700 scientific articles have been published, and more than 40 PhD or doctoral degrees and 13 Masters of International Health degrees have been obtained by researchers employed by the project.

=== Affiliations ===
Bandim Health Project is placed in Guinea-Bissau and also has a small department at Statens Serum Institut in Denmark. Bandim Health Project is also affiliated with University of Southern Denmark, where Peter Aaby is an adjunct professor and Christine Stabell Benn holds a professorship in Global Health.

== See also ==
- Vaccine hesitancy
- Proposed Guinea-Bissau hepatitis B vaccine trial
