= Proposed Guinea-Bissau hepatitis B vaccine trial =

Proposed and rejected clinical trial of hepatitis B vaccination in Guinea-Bissau

- Study type: Hepatitis B vaccine trial
- Locations: Guinea-Bissau
- Lead researcher: Peter Aaby and Christine Stabell Benn

The proposed hepatitis B vaccine trial in Guinea-Bissau, also known as the HBV-NSE trial, was to study the health effects of administering the hepatitis B vaccine to babies at six weeks age versus at birth. Giving the vaccine at birth is the practice in most of the world, its safety has been well-attested. The study was closed down due to ethical objections.

The study, a randomized controlled trial, was developed by researchers affiliated with the Bandim Health Project and the University of Southern Denmark, and funded by an award of US$1.6 million from the United States Centers for Disease Control and Prevention, under the authority of Secretary of Health and Human Services Robert F. Kennedy Jr. It was ostensibly intended to evaluate whether administration of the vaccine at birth affected childhood mortality, illness, and development beyond its established protective effect against hepatitis B infection, but experts questioned the intent of the experiment, and the ethics of its design. The proposed trial was ultimately formally rejected by the government of Guinea-Bissau in October 2026, and the country's judicial police subsequently searched the offices of the Bandim Health Project and seized vaccine supplies intended for the study. The trial was never conducted, and no participants were enrolled.

== Background ==
=== Hepatitis B vaccination ===
Hepatitis B is a viral infection that can cause chronic liver disease, cirrhosis, and liver cancer. Infection acquired during infancy is particularly likely to become chronic, with approximately 90% of newborns infected during childbirth developing chronic infection. The hepatitis B vaccine, first approved in 1981, has an established record of safety and effectiveness in preventing infection and its complications. Serious adverse effects are rare, and studies have found that vaccination can provide protection against clinical disease and chronic infection for at least 30 years.

The World Health Organization (WHO) recommends that all newborns receive an initial dose of hepatitis B vaccine as soon as possible after birth, preferably within 24 hours, followed by two or three additional doses. The birth dose is particularly important in preventing vertical transmission of the virus from an infected mother to her infant. According to the WHO, timely birth-dose vaccination prevents an estimated 70–95% of mother-to-child hepatitis B transmission. For newborns whose mothers are infected, administering hepatitis B immune globulin in addition to vaccination provides greater protection than vaccination alone.

Guinea-Bissau has a high prevalence of hepatitis B infection, with the WHO estimating in 2026 that more than 12% of adults were living with chronic infection in 2022 and that approximately 2% of children younger than five were infected in 2020. At the time of the proposed trial, the country's routine childhood immunization schedule did not include a hepatitis B birth dose, with infants instead receiving their first hepatitis B vaccination at approximately six weeks of age. In 2024, Guinea-Bissau decided to introduce universal hepatitis B vaccination at birth, with implementation planned by 2028. The WHO identified the timely introduction of the birth dose as an important measure for reducing hepatitis B transmission in the country.

=== Questioning of Bandim Health Project research practices ===
The Bandim Health Project has investigated the possible non-specific effects of vaccines, including effects on health outcomes other than the diseases against which vaccines are intended to protect. Researchers Peter Aaby and Christine Stabell Benn have contributed to this line of research, which has also been the subject of scientific criticism.

A 2025 article in Vaccine said that strong claims previously made by Benn and Aaby about non-specific vaccine effects were not supported by the evidence presented: "We were surprised to find several instances of questionable research practices, such as unpublished primary outcomes, outcome switching, reinterpretation of trials based on statistically fragile subgroup analyses, and frequent promotion of cherry-picked secondary findings as causal, even when primary outcomes yielded null results. Sample size calculations appeared to be driven by unwarranted optimism regarding effect-sizes and event rates leading to underpowered studies". Bandim Health Project requested the retraction of meta-analysis.

A 2026 article—also in Vaccine—reported on 10 pre-registered randomized controlled trials (RCTs) performed at the Bandim Health Project where the primary outcomes are partly or completely missing from the scientific records. Altogether these 10 RCTs included more than 74,000 children.

== Proposed study ==
=== Funding and institutional involvement ===
In December 2025, the United States Centers for Disease Control and Prevention, under the authority of Secretary of Health and Human Services Robert F. Kennedy Jr., awarded approximately US$1.6 million to the University of Southern Denmark for a proposed study of the timing of the hepatitis B vaccine birth dose in Guinea-Bissau. Christine Stabell Benn, a Professor of Global Health at the University of Southern Denmark, was identified as one of the leaders of the research team. The award was made without a competitive bidding process. Additional support from the Pershing Square Foundation and the Bluebell Foundation brought the total reported funding commitments to approximately $3.2 million. According to The BMJ, the researchers submitted an application for American funding within hours of a 19 September 2025 meeting of the United States Advisory Committee on Immunization Practices (ACIP), at which the committee considered changing the longstanding recommendation for universal hepatitis B vaccination at birth. Emails obtained by Danish newspaper Weekendavisen indicated that Lyn Redwood and Stuart Burns, two senior health department officials appointed under Kennedy, helped guide the application through the funding process, with Burns characterizing the proposal as a funding priority.

Kennedy had previously praised the research of Peter Aaby and Stabell Benn, and the award followed efforts by bodies under Kennedy's control to change United States hepatitis B vaccination recommendations. Stabell Benn had served as a consultant to a working group of the Advisory Committee on Immunization Practices that considered the timing of hepatitis B vaccination. The researchers disputed suggestions that the trial had been developed to advance Kennedy's vaccination policies, maintaining that the research proposal had originated independently of subsequent American policy decisions.

=== Proposed design ===
The original proposed randomized controlled trial was intended to enroll approximately 14,000 newborns. One group would receive the vaccine at birth, while the other would follow the country's existing schedule and receive it six weeks later. Researchers aimed to examine mortality, illness and developmental outcomes. Later in 2026, it was reported that a version of the protocol dated August 4, 2026 included "introduction of a saline injection as a placebo for the birth dose of hepatitis B vaccine", as well as peripartum screening of the mothers for HBsAg, with infants born to those testing positive being excluded from the trial, and instead receiving the birth-dose hepatitis B vaccine.

=== Scientific and ethical controversy ===
The study attracted criticism from public-health researchers who argued that withholding the birth dose from some newborns would expose them to preventable infection. The Bandim research team responded that Guinea-Bissau did not routinely administer the vaccine at birth and argued that the study would evaluate the vaccine before the country's planned introduction of a universal birth dose.

The World Health Organization subsequently stated that it had significant concerns about the study's scientific justification, ethical safeguards and compliance with accepted principles for research involving human participants.

== Response ==
=== Suspension and institutional review ===
In January 2026, the government of Guinea-Bissau suspended the study pending an ethical and technical review, after the health minister said that the committee associated with its original approval had not formally met to evaluate it. Conflicting public statements exacerbated uncertainty about the status of the trials. On 19 January 2026, Africa CDC official Yap Boum stated that the study had been canceled following criticism by researchers and ethicists, but two days later, the United States Department of Health and Human Services told The BMJ that the study was proceeding as planned, with protocols being finalized. On 22 January, in the wake of a November 2025 military coup in the country that had brought a transitional government to power, health minister Quinhi Nantot again stated that the study had been suspended pending ethics review. Jean Kaseya, director-general of the Africa Centres for Disease Control and Prevention, emphasized that African public health authorities should determine whether the study could proceed and supported additional ethical review.

In March 2026, the University of Southern Denmark said it had paused all work associated with the proposed trial while seeking an independent ethical evaluation. United States health officials stated that the study remained under review and could proceed only after approval from the relevant authorities.

=== Rejection and police investigation ===
On 16 October 2026, Guinea-Bissau's Council of Ministers formally reaffirmed its decision not to accept the proposed trial. The decision was confirmed by Stabell Benn in correspondence with Ars Technica, published on 22 October. She expressed regret over the decision but acknowledged the government's authority to determine whether the research could take place in the country.

On 19 October 2026, Guinea-Bissau's judicial police searched the offices of the Bandim Health Project and seized hepatitis B vaccine doses intended for the trial. According to the police, the investigation concerned the circumstances surrounding the acquisition, transportation, storage and traceability of the vaccines. Authorities indicated that the seizure did not imply that the vaccines themselves were defective or unsafe.
