= List of hospitals in Guinea-Bissau =

As of 2019, there were eight Ministry of Public Health hospitals in Guinea-Bissau.

Hospitals in Guinea-Bissau
Name	Region	Type hospital	Coordinates	Ref
Hospital 3 de Agosto	Bissau region	Hospital	11.8595192353593°N 15.6175912187203°W	
Hospital de Bandim	Bissau region	Hospital	11.8458°N 15.5983°W	
Hospital de Súo Domingos	Cacheu region	Hospital	12.3524°N 16.4401°W	
Hospital do Mal de Hansen de Cumura	Biombo region	Hospital	11.8298°N 15.6914°W	
Hospital Nacional Simão Mendes	Bissau region	National Hospital	11.8634°N 15.5861°W	
Hospital Raoul Follereau	Bissau region	Hospital	11.8672051568066°N 15.58424295164°W	
Hospital Regional de Bafata	Bafatá region	Regional Hospital	12.1689°N 14.6613°W	
Hospital Regional de Gabu	Gabú region	Regional Hospital	12.2791°N 14.2206°W	
Hospital Regional de Mansoa	Oio region	Regional Hospital	12.0774°N 15.3229°W	
Hospital Solidariedade de Bolama	Bolama region	Hospital	11.5749°N 15.4781°W	
Military Hospital of Guiné-Bissau	Bissau region	Military hospital	11.8686749272547°N 15.630551653251°W	
