= Peter Aaby =

Danish anthropologist and epidemiologist

- Born: 6 November 1944 (age 81); Lund, Sweden
- Citizenship: Danish
- Scientific career
- Education: University of Copenhagen
- Known for: Non-specific effects of vaccines
- Awards: Novo Nordisk Prize (2000)
- Fields: Anthropology, epidemiology, global health
- Workplaces: Bandim Health Project

Peter Aaby (born 6 November 1944) is a Danish anthropologist and epidemiologist. He founded the Bandim Health Project in Guinea-Bissau in 1978 and is a professor in the Department of Clinical Research at the University of Southern Denmark. His research has focused on childhood infections, mortality and the proposed non-specific effects of vaccines.

== Career ==
Aaby graduated in social anthropology from the University of Copenhagen in 1974. In 1988, the university awarded him a Doctor of Medical Science degree for his research on measles infection and mortality. Aaby travelled to Bissau in 1978 to investigate the causes of high childhood mortality. A nutrition and child-health study was established in the Bandim district, where researchers registered pregnancies, births, deaths and migration. This population registration became the basis of the Bandim Health Project's continuing health and demographic surveillance system, which later expanded to additional urban and rural areas.

== Vaccine research ==
Aaby and his collaborators have investigated whether vaccines may affect morbidity and mortality beyond their protection against the infections they target, a proposed phenomenon known as the non-specific effects of vaccines. Their research has examined the measles vaccine, BCG vaccine, oral polio vaccine, DTP vaccine and smallpox vaccine.

The interpretation and public-health significance of the proposed effects remain debated. In 2004, an independent task force convened by the World Health Organization's Global Advisory Committee on Vaccine Safety concluded that the available evidence did not support an increased risk of childhood mortality following DTP vaccination. The committee recommended no change to vaccination policy but stated that it would continue monitoring evidence concerning other possible non-specific effects.

=== Criticism of research methods ===
A 2025 commentary published in the journal Vaccine re-examined randomized trials conducted by the Bandim Health Project. Its authors argued that the trials' primary outcomes generally did not support some of the broader claims made about non-specific vaccine effects and criticised the use of unpublished primary outcomes, outcome switching, secondary findings and subgroup analyses. Aaby and Christine Stabell Benn disputed the analysis and asked the journal to retract the commentary; the request was denied.

=== Proposed hepatitis B vaccine trial ===
In December 2025, the United States Centers for Disease Control and Prevention announced an award of approximately US$1.6 million over five years to the University of Southern Denmark for a proposed randomized trial concerning the timing of the hepatitis B vaccine birth dose in Guinea-Bissau. The proposed study was intended to enrol more than 14,000 newborns and examine mortality, serious illness and long-term developmental outcomes.

The proposed design attracted criticism because some participating newborns would not receive the vaccine at birth. In January 2026, the government of Guinea-Bissau suspended the study pending an ethical review. In February, the World Health Organization stated that it had significant concerns about the study's scientific justification, ethical safeguards and design, and said that the trial in its publicly described form was inconsistent with established scientific and ethical principles.

== Honours ==
Aaby received the Novo Nordisk Prize for advances in medical science in 2000. In 2015, he received an honorary doctorate from the Universidade NOVA de Lisboa. He was elected a member of the Academia Europaea in 2020.

== See also ==
- Bandim Health Project
- Proposed Guinea-Bissau hepatitis B vaccine trial
- Statens Serum Institut
