= Non-specific effect =

Non-specific effect may refer to:

- Placebo, as placebo treatment in controlled medical trials.
- Non-specific effect of vaccines, as effects from vaccines other than those on the targeted disease.
