= Preben von Magnus =

Danish medical researcher

- Born: Preben Christian Alexander von Magnus; 25 February 1912; Copenhagen, Denmark
- Died: 9 August 1973 (aged 61)
- Education: University of Copenhagen
- Known for: Von Magnus phenomenon; First to identify Monkeypox virus; Directed the first Danish polio vaccination programme
- Medical career
- Profession: Physician
- Field: Virology

Preben Christian Alexander von Magnus (25 February 1912 – 9 August 1973) was a Danish virologist who is known for his research on influenza, polio vaccination and mpox. He gave his name to the Von Magnus phenomenon.

In the 1950s, together with his wife the virologist Herdis von Magnus, he directed the first Danish vaccination programme against polio. In 1958, he was the first to confirm the identity of the mpox virus and to describe mpox in laboratory crab-eating Macaques during two outbreaks of the disease in the summer and autumn of that year. In 1959 he was appointed director of the Statens Serum Institut.

He represented Denmark at the 1959 Pugwash Conferences on Science and World Affairs where he explained that respiratory viruses such as influenza and the common cold were unsuitable as biological weapons. He became a Knight of the Order of the Dannebrog in 1965.

== Early life ==
Preben von Magnus was born in Copenhagen on 25 February 1912 to the Livonian landowner Constantin Woldemar von Magnus and physician Rigmor von Magnus (née Herbst). He graduated from the Gammel Hellerup Gymnasium in 1931 and became a graduate of law and a Candidate of Medicine from the University of Copenhagen in 1939.

== Career ==
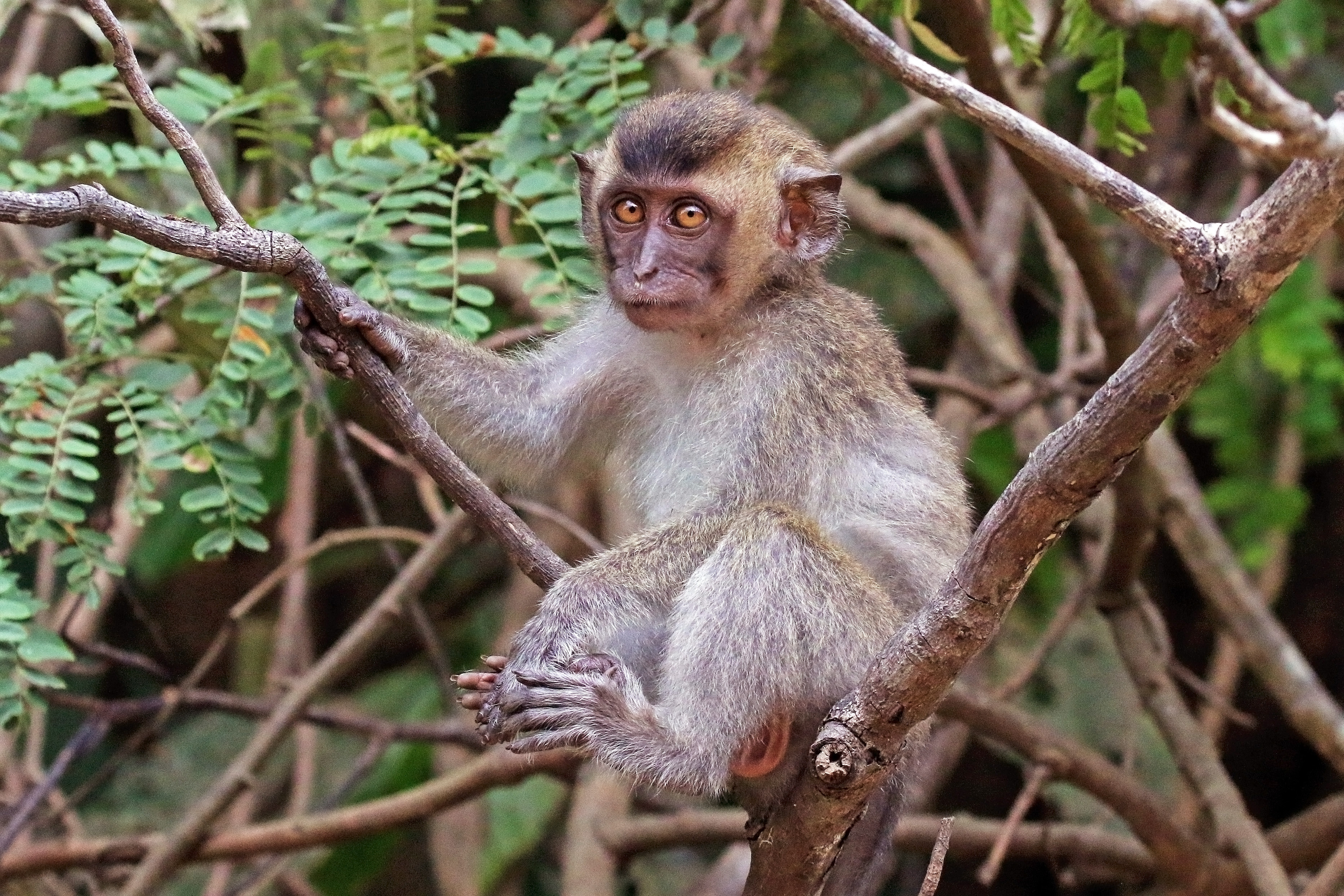
Long-tailed macaque (Macaca fascicularis) juvenile

Following his junior hospital posts in 1943, he worked at the Statens Serum Institut, and in 1944 published, with his wife Herdis von Magnus, the initial study that led to the discovery of what today is known as the Von Magnus phenomenon.

Von Magnus became Doctor of Medical Science in 1952, after defending his doctoral dissertation Propagation of the PR8 strain of influenza A virus in chick embryos. He was director of the Danish Influenza Centre and in 1959 was appointed director of the Statens Serum Institut. In 1951, he was a member of the UNRRA aid to South Korean civilians. He served on the Danish hospital ship MS Jutlandia and he became a member of the Advisory Panel on Virus Disease of the World Health Organization. In addition, in 1960, he became an advisor to the Danish National Health Service on bacteriology and serology. In 1965, he was appointed to the Danish Science Advisory Council, where he served as its vice-chairman and chairman. Three years later he became a member and co-founder of the Danish Royal Scientific Society.

=== Von Magnus phenomenon ===
Despite the inability to isolate them, von Magnus discovered defective interfering particles (DIPs) using the "influenza virus system". He called them "incomplete" or "immature". He found that when viruses were expanded at high doses, "incomplete viruses" or "particles" were produced and that these interfered with viral replication. This resulted in a reduction in the infectivity of influenza. The physiological interaction between DIPs and the host, and the effect of DIPs on the replication of infectious standard virus, have since been studied.

=== Danish polio vaccination programme ===
Following Jonas Salk's discovery of a polio vaccine in the early 1950s, the United States State Department sent details of polio vaccine manufacturing to those that requested it, with the permission of President Eisenhower. Von Magnus and his wife Herdis were not only Salk's lifelong friends, but were also appointed by the Danish government to direct the vaccination of all 7 to 12 year olds. The Statens Serum Institut produced its own modified polio vaccine using techniques based on what the von Magnus's had learnt in the spring of 1953, when they accepted an invitation to visit Salk's laboratory. Due to the limited supply of inactivated virus, the Danish institute administered the vaccine subcutaneously, requiring smaller doses.

=== Mpox ===
Naturally occurring pox infections in non-human primates were first reported by Rijk Gispen in 1949. Due to the similar clinical appearances, some of these cases may have been due to monkeypox rather than smallpox.

In 1958, von Magnus was the first to confirm the identity of the mpox virus and to describe mpox in laboratory crab-eating Macaques during two outbreaks of the disease in the summer and autumn of that year. A little more than thirty cases of monkeys with monkeypox were reported, more than fifty days after their arrival by ship from Singapore. There were no deaths and no monkey-to-human transmission. Not all the exposed monkeys exhibited the illness. He isolated the virus from monkey kidney tissue cell culture and from the chorioallantoic membrane of chick embryos. The characteristic appearance of the virus led von Magnus to elucidate that it belonged to the smallpox-vaccinia group of Poxviridae.

In 1968, the WHO reported that it was not infrequent to observe outbreaks of suspected smallpox and monkeypox in laboratory monkeys at more than twenty-five biological institutions around the world and that further research was warranted to assess susceptibity in humans. It was not until 1970, more than ten years after von Magnus identified the virus, that monkeypox was first identified in humans.

== Honours and awards ==
In 1959, von Magnus represented Denmark at the 1959 Pugwash Conferences on Science and World Affairs, where he explained that respiratory viruses such as influenza and the common cold were unsuitable as biological weapons as they rarely produced severe effects and were already common among human populations, resulting in some level of immunity. He warned however, that such viruses were stable and easily cultured and therefore the emergence of a new virus with a more serious impact, through mutation or deliberate cultivation, could not be ruled out.

He was a member of the Akademiet for de Tekniske Videnskaber from 1960, of the Royal Danish Academy of Sciences and Letters from 1968, and became Knight of the Order of the Dannebrog in 1965. He received a Doctor honoris causa from Glasgow University in 1971.

== Death ==
Von Magnus died on 9 August 1973. At the time, his wife was in a senior position in epidemiology at the Statens Serum Instut. They had two children.

== Selected publications ==
=== Articles ===
- Georgieff M (1986). "[Metabolic effect of intravenously administered glucose, xylose or glycerin in various dosages and combinations]". Beitr Infusionther Klin Ernahr. 16: 103–19. PMID 3094499.
- von Magnus, Preben; Andersen, Else Krag; Petersen, Knud Birkum; Birch-Andersen, Aksel (2009). "A Pox-Like Disease in Cynomolgus Monkeys". Acta Pathologica et Microbiologica Scandinavica. 46 (2): 156–176. doi:10.1111/j.1699-0463.1959.tb00328.x.
- "Studies on Measles Virus in Monkey Kidney Tissue Cultures", Statens Seruminstitut (via archive.org), 20 June 1957.

=== Book chapters ===
- "Incomplete Forms of Influenza Virus", in Kenneth M. Smith and Max A. Lauffer's Advances in Virus Research, Volume 2, Academic Press Inc. Publishers, New York (1954).
