= Med-Vet-Net =

Med-Vet-Net is a European Network of Excellence for zoonosis research. The Network officially commenced on 1 September 2004 until 31 October 2009. It was funded for five years at a cost of €14.4 million (£10 million) by the European Union (EU) 6th Framework Programme, within the ‘Quality and Safety of Food’ Priority Area. In October 2009 the network continued to start the Med-Vet-Net Association for Zoonoses Research.

Zoonoses are diseases that are naturally transmitted from animals to man.

Med-Vet-Net aimed to develop a network of excellence for the integration of veterinary, medical and food scientists, in the field of food safety, at the European Level, in order to improve research on the prevention and control of zoonoses, including food-borne diseases. The Network also aimed to take into account the public health concerns of consumers and other stakeholders throughout the food chain.

Med-Vet-Net comprised 15 partners across Europe and over 300 scientists. The institutes involved consisted of eight veterinary, seven public health institutes and one learned society from 10 European countries. All partner institutes had national reference laboratory-based responsibilities for the prevention and control of zoonoses.

== Med-Vet-Net Association for Zoonoses Research ==
Following the end of EU funding the Med-Vet-Net Association was officially launched in October 2009 to continue work started within the former Network of Excellence. The self-funded Association, currently comprises 21 European research institutes.

- (Austria) Austrian Agency for Health and Food Safety (AGES)
- (Austria) University of Veterinary Medicine, Vienna
- (Belgium) SCIENSANO
- (Denmark] Statens Serum Institut (SSI)
- (Denmark) Technical University of Denmark (Vet-DTU) (Food-DTU)
- (Denmark) Faculty of Health and Medical Sciences, University of Copenhagen
- (Finland) Finnish Food Authority (RUOKA)
- (France) Agence nationale de securite sanitaire de l'alimentation, de l'environnement et du travail (ANSES) (Formerly AFSSA)
- (Germany) Federal Institute for RiskAssessment | Bundesinstitut für Risikobewertung (BfR)
- (Ireland) Central Veterinary Research Laboratory (CVRL)
- (Ireland) National University of Ireland, Galway (NUIG)
- (Italy) Central Public Health Institute in Italy | Istituto Superiore di Sanita (ISS)
- (Netherlands) Wageningen Bioveterinary Research (WBVR) (formerly Central Veterinary Institute; CVI) of Wageningen University & Research (WUR)
- (Netherlands) National Institute for Public Health and the Environment | Rijksinstituut voor Volksgezondheit en Milieu (RIVM)
- (Norway) Norwegian Veterinary Institute | Veterinærinstituttet (NVI)
- (Norway) Norwegian Institute for Public Health (FHI)
- (Poland) National Veterinary Research Institute | Państwowy Instytut Weterynaryjny - Państwowy Instytut Babdwczy (PIWET)
- (Spain) The Complutense University of Madrid | Complutense University Madrid (UCM)
- (Serbia) Pasteur Institute Novi Sad | ЗАРЗ Пастеров завод Нови Сад (PINS)
- (Sweden) National Veterinary Institute | Statens Veterinärmedicinska Anstalt (SVA)
- (UK) Animal Health and Plant Health Agency (APHA)
- (UK) University of Surrey (UoS)
