= Therapeutic interfering particle =

Drug class

A therapeutic interfering particle is an antiviral preparation that reduces the replication rate and pathogenesis of a particular viral infectious disease. A therapeutic interfering particle is typically a biological agent (i.e., nucleic acid) engineered from portions of the viral genome being targeted. Similar to Defective Interfering Particles (DIPs), the agent competes with the pathogen within an infected cell for critical viral replication resources, reducing the viral replication rate and resulting in reduced pathogenesis. But, in contrast to DIPs, TIPs are engineered to have an in vivo basic reproductive ratio (R_{0}) that is greater than 1 (R_{0}>1). The term "TIP" was first introduced in 2011 based on models of its mechanism-of-action from 2003. Given their unique R_{0}>1 mechanism of action, TIPs exhibit high barriers to the evolution of antiviral resistance and are predicted to be resistance proof. Intervention with therapeutic interfering particles can be prophylactic (to prevent or ameliorate the effects of a future infection), or a single-administration therapeutic (to fight a disease that has already occurred, such as HIV or COVID-19). Synthetic DIPs that rely on stimulating innate antiviral immune responses (i.e., interferon) were proposed for influenza in 2008 and shown to protect mice to differing extents but are technically distinct from TIPs due to their alternate molecular mechanism of action which has not been predicted to have a similarly high barrier to resistance. Subsequent work tested the pre-clinical efficacy of TIPs against HIV, a synthetic DIP for SARS-CoV-2 (in vitro), and a TIP for SARS-CoV-2 (in vivo).

== Mechanism of action ==
Therapeutic Interfering Particles, often referred to as TIPs, are typically synthetic, engineered versions of naturally occurring defective interfering particles (DIPs), in which critical portions of the virus genome are deleted rendering the TIP unable to replicate on its own. Often a TIP has the vast majority of the virus genome deleted. However, TIPs are engineered to retain specific elements of the genome that allow them to efficiently compete with the wild-type virus for critical replication resources inside an infected cell. TIPs thereby deprive wild-type virus of replication material through competitive inhibition, and therapeutically reduce viral load. Competitive inhibition enables TIPs to conditionally replicate and efficiently mobilize between cells, essentially "piggybacking" on wild-type virus, to act as single-administration antivirals with a high genetic barrier to the evolution of resistance. TIPs have been engineered for HIV and SARS-CoV-2, and do not induce innate immune responses such as interferon

Three mechanistic criteria define a TIP:

1. Conditional replication: Due to a lack of genes required for replication, TIPs cannot self-replicate. However, when wild-type virus is present in the same cell (i.e., there is a superinfection of the cell), it provides the missing intracellular replication resources, allowing TIPs to conditionally replicate. In molecular genetics terms, the wild-type virus is said to provide complementation in trans.
2. Interference via competitive inhibition: TIPs reduce wild-type virus replication specifically by competing for intracellular viral replication resources (e.g., packaging proteins like the capsid). This mechanism of action reduces wild-type virus burst size and provides TIPs with a high genetic barrier to the evolution of viral resistance.
3. Mobilization with R_{0}>1: when a TIP is conditionally activated by the wild-type "helper" virus in a super-infected cell, it will generate virus-like particles (VLPs). These TIP VLPs mobilize from the cell, are phenotypically identical to the virus being targeted, and can transduce new target cells. The central requirement for a therapeutic interfering particle is that it mobilizes with a basic reproductive ratio (R_{0}) that is greater than 1 (R_{0}>1). That is, for every TIP-producing cell, more than one new TIP-transduced cell must be generated. This third characteristic differentiates TIPs from naturally occurring DIPs.

As a result of these mechanistic criteria, TIPs have been referred to as "piggyback" or alternatively as "virus hijackers".

TIPs do not stimulate or function through the induction of innate cellular immune responses (such as interferon). In fact, stimulation of innate cellular antiviral mechanisms has been shown to contravene criterion (#3) (i.e., R_{0}>1), as innate immune mechanisms inhibit efficient mobilization of TIPs. As such, several VLP-based therapy proposals for influenza and other viruses that do not satisfy these criteria are DIPs, but not TIPs.

== History ==
TIPs are built off the phenomenon of defective interfering particles (DIPs) discovered by Preben Von Magnus in the early 1950s, during his work on influenza viruses. DIPs are spontaneously arising virus mutants, first described by von Magnus as "incomplete" viruses, in which a critical portion of the viral genome has been lost. Direct evidence for DIPs was only found in the 1960s by Hackett, who observed the presence of "stumpy" particles of vesicular stomatitis virus in electron micrographs, and the DIP terminology was formalized in 1970 by Huang and Baltimore. DIPs have been reported for many classes of DNA and RNA viruses in clinical and laboratory settings.

Whereas DIPs had been proposed as potential therapeutics that would act via stimulation of the immune system – a concept tested in influenza with mixed results – the TIP R_{0}>1 mechanism of action was first proposed in 2003 with the term "TIP" and the unique benefits of the R_{0}>1 mechanism shown in 2011.

In 2016 the US government launched a major funding initiative (DARPA INTERCEPT, ) to discover and engineer antiviral TIPs for diverse viruses, based on prior investments from the US National Institutes of Health. This program led to renewed interest in the concept of interfering particles as therapies with the development of technologies to isolate DIPs for influenza and engineer TIPs for HIV and Zika virus. The first successful experimental demonstration of the TIP concept was reported in 2019 for HIV, and the discovery of a TIP for SARS-CoV-2 was reported in 2020 and results on the effect on hamsters in 2021. In 2020, the US government funded first-in-human clinical trials of TIPs.
