= Health in Guinea-Bissau =

The WHO's estimate of life expectancy for a female child born in Guinea-Bissau in 2008 was 49 years, and 47 years for a boy. in 2016 life expectancy had improved to 58 for men and 61 for women.

The prevalence of HIV-infection among the adult population is 1.8%. Only 20% of infected pregnant women receive anti retroviral coverage to prevent transmission to newborns.

Malaria kills more residents; 9% of the population have reported infection, It causes three times as many deaths as AIDS. In 2008, fewer than half of children younger than five slept under antimalaria nets or had access to antimalarial drugs.

Despite lowering rates in surrounding countries, cholera rates were reported in November 2012 to be on the rise, with 1,500 cases reported and nine deaths. A 2008 cholera epidemic in Guinea-Bissau affected 14,222 people and killed 225.

The 2010 maternal mortality rate per 100,000 live births for Guinea Bissau was 1000. This compares with 804.3 in 2008 and 966 in 1990. The under-5 mortality rate, per 1,000 live births, was 195 and the neonatal mortality as a percentage of under-5 mortality was 24. The number of midwives per 1,000 live births was 3; one out of eighteen pregnant women die as a result of pregnancy. According to a 2013 UNICEF report, 50% of women in Guinea Bissau had undergone female genital mutilation. In 2010, Guinea Bissau had the seventh-highest maternal mortality rate in the world.

The Human Rights Measurement Initiative finds that Guinea-Bissau is fulfilling 61.2% of what it should be fulfilling for the right to health based on its level of income. When looking at the right to health with respect to children, Guinea-Bissau achieves 85.8% of what is expected based on its current income. In regards to the right to health amongst the adult population, the country achieves only 70.8% of what is expected based on the nation's level of income. Guinea-Bissau falls into the "very bad" category when evaluating the right to reproductive health because the nation is fulfilling only 27.0% of what the nation is expected to achieve based on the resources (income) it has available.

== Healthcare ==
The WHO estimated there were fewer than 5 physicians per 100,000 persons in the country in 2009. Guinea-Bissau has an unusually high ratio of nursing staff to doctors.

Medical facilities outside Bissau are virtually non existent. In Bissau there is the Raoul Follerau Hospital, and the Hospital Nacional Simão Mendes.

The London School of Hygiene and Tropical Medicine is conducting research into infectious diseases on the Bijagos Islands. Because the islands are so isolated there is less danger of contamination of the results than in other places.
