= Responses to the COVID-19 pandemic in August 2022 =

Aspect of viral disease pandemic

This article documents the chronology of the response to the COVID-19 pandemic in August 2022, which originated in Wuhan, China in December 2019. Some developments may become known or fully understood only in retrospect. Reporting on this pandemic began in December 2019.

== Reactions and measures in the Western Pacific ==
=== 1 August ===
- New Zealand, Samoa, and Tonga reopen their borders to international visitors and temporary visa holders.

== See also ==
- Timeline of the COVID-19 pandemic in August 2022
- Responses to the COVID-19 pandemic
