= Herdis von Magnus =

Danish physician, virologist

- Born: 23 September 1912; Bogense, Denmark
- Died: 15 March 1992 (aged 79); Gentofte, Denmark
- Education: University of Copenhagen
- Occupations: Physician virologist
- Known for: Polio expert
- Spouse: Preben von Magnus
- Parents: Hans Hansen (father); Astrid Marie Nielsen-Rye (mother)

Herdis von Magnus (23 September 1912 – 15 March 1992, Gentofte) was a Danish virologist and polio expert. After working with Jonas Salk, she and her husband directed the first polio vaccination program in Denmark. She also researched encephalitis.

== Life and work ==
Herdis von Magnus was born in Bogense, Denmark to teachers Hans Hansen (1888–1960) and Astrid Marie Nielsen-Rye (1885–1945). In 1931, she attended the Roskilde Cathedral School and in 1939 she graduated from the University of Copenhagen.

She rotated at Odense County and City Hospital and took various graduate positions at other hospitals in Copenhagen. Then she acquired a position as an assistant at the State Serum Institute in 1944 and started her own comprehensive study of encephalomyelitis in mice using a virus discovered by virologist Max Theiler in 1937.

Virologist Jonas Salk published his pioneering work in the spring of 1953 announcing a new polio vaccine, which was inactivated with formalin. On learning of the breakthrough, "Herdis von Magnus and her husband, Preben von Magnus, went on a study stay in Salk's laboratory as early as 1953."

In Denmark, a polio vaccination campaign began In April 1955, just ten days after the U.S. health authorities launched its nationwide inoculation effort. When the U.S. authorities had to pause its vaccination campaign because of a factory error, Herdis von Magnus insisted on continuing vaccine distribution in Denmark because she was confident that the serum created in her country had undergone a more thorough quality control process and was safe to use, and it was.

"Thanks to Herdis von Magnus, Denmark was at the forefront of Europe, which meant that polio epidemics which affected a number of nearby European countries in the late 1950s were avoided in Denmark."

In 1956, Herdis von Magnus became head of department at the State Serum Institute in Copenhagen, and two years later she was named chief physician of its enterovirus department. From 1968 until 1980, she served as an expert advisor to the Danish National Board of Health, especially regarding epidemiology and vaccination issues.

== U.N. positions ==
- 1952: joined the expert committee on viral diseases for the United Nations' World Health Organization (WHO).
- 1962: became head of the WHO's regional reference center for enterovirus.
- 1974: was head of the WHO's Collaborating Center for Virus Reference and Research until 1980.

== Selected publications ==
- Von Magnus, Herdis, and Joseph L. Melnick. "Tonsillectomy in experimental poliomyelitis." American Journal of Hygiene 48.1 (1948): 113–119.
- Melnick, Joseph L., and Herdis von Magnus. "Comparative susceptibility of cynomolgus and other monkey species to poliomyelitis virus by the intracerebral and oral routes." American Journal of Epidemiology 48.1 (1948): 107–112.
- Von Magnus, Herdis, J. H. Gear, and John R. Paul. "A recent definition of poliomyelitis viruses." Virology 1.2 (1955): 185–189.
- Von Magnus, Herdis, et al. "Polio Vaccination in Denmark in April–June 1955. I. The Production of Formalinized Polio Vaccine and Preliminary Results." Danish medical bulletin 2.8 (1955): 226–233.
- Godtfredsen, Annelise, and Herdis Von Magnus. "Isolation of ECHO virus type 9 from cerebrospinal fluids." Danish medical bulletin 4.8 (1957): 233–236.
- Von Magnus, Herdis, and Inger Petersen. "Vaccination with inactivated poliovirus vaccine and oral poliovirus vaccine in Denmark." Reviews of infectious diseases 6.Supplement_2 (1984): S471-S474.
