= Donetsk National Medical University =

Public university in Kropyvnytskyi and Mariupol, Ukraine

Coordinates: 48.0019°N 37.8287°E

- ДЗВО "Донецький національний медичний університет"
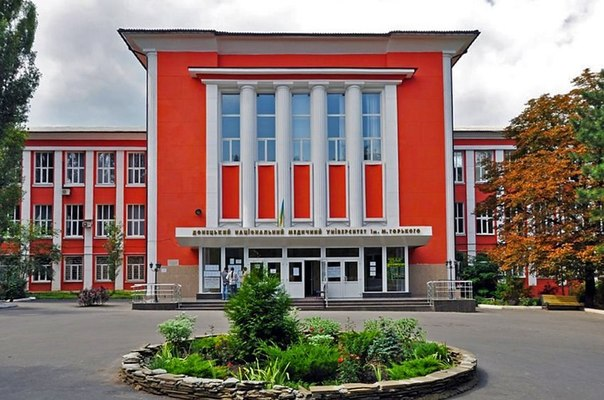
- University main building
- Former names: Maxim Gorky Donetsk National Medical University
- Motto: Propter vitam alienam vivere
- Motto in English: We live for the life of others
- Type: Medical university
- Established: 1930
- Accreditation: Ministry of Education and Science of Ukraine
- Academic affiliations: World Federation Medical Education; General medical council; Pakistan medical commission
- Rector: prof. Kondratenko Petro Gennadiyovich
- Students: 15200
- Undergraduates: 7000
- Postgraduates: 1400
- Doctoral students: 3000
- Location: (de facto) Kropyvnytskyi, Kirovohrad oblast, Ukraine
- Campus: Urban
- Website: dsmu.edu.ua
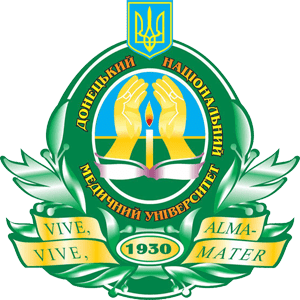

The Donetsk National Medical University (abbr. DNMU, Ukrainian: Донецький національний медичний університет) is one of the largest medical state-sponsored universities in Ukraine and the former USSR. The university is considered one of the best medical schools in Ukraine. Originally located in Donetsk, it was relocated to Kropyvnytskyi and Mariupol in 2014 due to the War in Donbas.

== History ==
Donetsk National Medical University was established in 1930 as the Maxim Gorky Donetsk Medical Institute. In 1994 it was given the status of University and in 2007 it gained the status of National Medical University (NMU). The name of M. Gorky was removed from the title in 2017.

== Rankings & reputations ==
In the latest national university rankings (Top 10 in Ukraine, years 2019 and 2021), DNMU was ranked as the first best medical university, and was the 4th best university overall in Ukraine. When other indicators (i.e. Scopus citations and webometrics) were included, DNMU kept its status as the best medical university in Ukraine also in 2014.

Due to the quality of training and comparatively low tuition fees DNMU is an attractive study choice among Ukrainian medical universities for foreigners. The Donetsk National Medical University is listed in the medical directories of the World Health Organization (WHO) and I-Med Schools.

Internationally, Donetsk National Medical University is ranked 3003rd out of 11,000 universities in the world according to the uniRank.org Ranking and 2021st on the Webtronics world ranking.

== Students and studies ==
Approximately 15,200 students study at the eight faculties of Donetsk National Medical University from Ukraine, Russia, Georgia, Armenia, Azerbaijan, Turkmenistan, US, the UK, Germany, Poland, Greece, Israel, Turkey, India, Nepal, Sri Lanka, China, Malaysia, Mauritius, Pakistan, Ghana, Nigeria, Cameroon, Peru, Palestine, Iran, Iraq, Kuwait, Jordan, Syria, Tunisia, Kenya, Namibia, Zambia, Somalia, Lebanon, Bahrain and other countries.

So far, the university has granted 65,000 degrees, to doctors, well-known scientists, researchers, health care providers from Ukraine, Russia, other ex-Soviet republics and 89 countries in Asia, Africa, Europe and the Americas.

At the Donetsk National Medical University there are eight faculties including a preparatory faculty for foreign students. The Donetsk National Medical University trains specialists along the following education or qualification levels as junior specialists, specialists, or Masters for the following specialties:

- Medicine;
- Pediatrics;
- Dentistry;
- Pharmacy;
- Nursing;
- Public Health;
- Post-Graduate Education;
- Preparatory Department.

Donetsk National Medical University provides training in English, Russian and in Ukrainian languages in all faculties.

According to the Ukrainian Health Ministry Order N°148 of March 22, 2004 DNMU has been appointed as the regional centre of Bologna Process management in Ukraine. In the 2005/06 academic year, DNMU started teaching its students in accordance with the Bologna Agreement on specialists training using the credit-modular system, which makes it possible to obtain the European Diploma at the end of the study. Students of Donetsk National Medical University can transfer of their credits to any other European medical university at any time after completing their first year of education at DNMU. Transfers to other European universities are made under the auspices of the Bologna process. The Donetsk National Medical University has signed cooperation agreements concerning the exchange of students with almost 160 different universities in the CIS, Europe, Canada, USA and with some Arab countries.

== Campus ==
The students of DNMU get their professional training at 26 specialized bases (including Donetsk multi-field medical and preventive organizations and research institutes) and 28 highly equipped clinical bases (including the main hospitals of Donetsk) under the supervision of highly qualified specialists.

Donetsk National Medical University provides its students with accommodation and study facilities. The students' campus has 13 study buildings equipped with 37 computer classes and libraries, 9 student hostels with reading halls and sports rooms, a health center for preventive care, stadium, sports and health service complexes.

== Staff ==
At present the total teaching staff at Donetsk National Medical University is 1147. Among them are 150 professors and 243 associate professors, academic title of doctors and candidates of medical sciences are respectively 117 and 449 people. The Donetsk National Medical University is a member of the National Academy of Sciences of Ukraine and two corresponding members of AMS of Ukraine, 4 laureates of the State Prize of Ukraine, 18 distinguished scientists and engineers, 8 distinguished doctors, 2 Honorary Workers of Education of Ukraine, 37 full members of international and departmental academies science, and 1 Hero of Ukraine.

== Notable alumni ==
- Dmytro Kirpulyanskyy
- Ivan Ivanovich Mavrov
- Gennady Onishchenko
- Amabélia Rodrigues
- Ravil Safiullin
- Maksym Stepanov

== See also ==
- List of universities in Ukraine
- List of medical universities in Ukraine
