= Amabélia Rodrigues =

Epidemiology researcher in Guinea-Bissau

Academic background
- Education: Donetsk National Medical University; University of Copenhagen; London School of Hygiene & Tropical Medicine

Amabélia Rodrigues is a Bissau-Guinean epidemiologist. She is the first female director of the National Institute of Public Health of Guinea-Bissau. She is also the lead research coordinator of the Bandim Health Project.

== Biography ==
Rodrigues was born in Guinea-Bissau, the daughter of a police chief who instilled in her a liking towards her studies.

She earned a grant from the government to go and study medicine, in particular in public health at Donetsk National Medical University, in what is now Ukraine. Finishing the course, she decided to return to Guinea-Bissau and begin work as an epidemiologist, at the Directorate-General of Hygiene and with the State Epidemiologist, fighting against the HIV/AIDS epidemic.

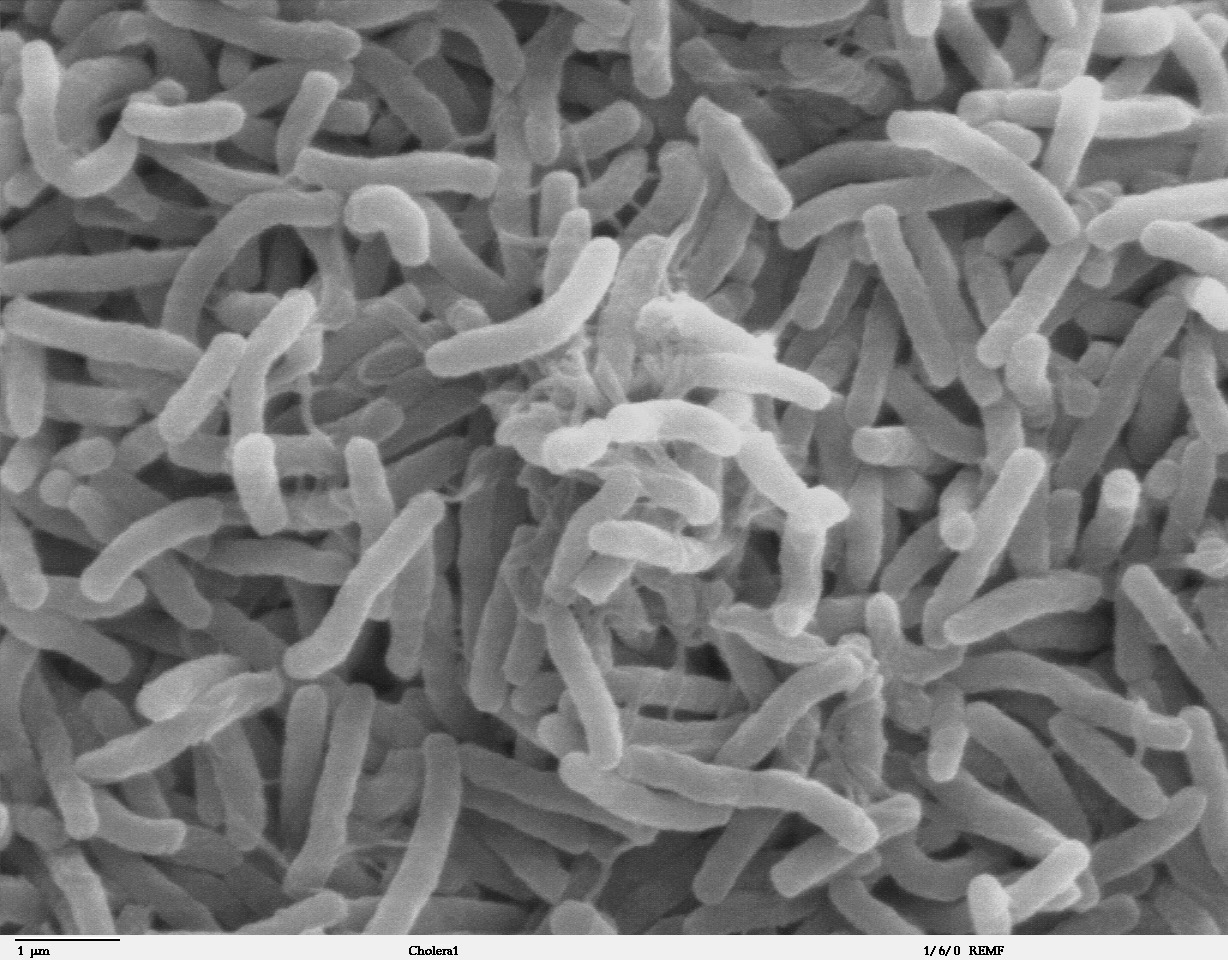
Cholera bacteria

During this time period, Guinea-Bissau was beset by a cholera epidemic and Rodrigues, after following recommendations made by the World Health Organization, decided to investigate the factors involving the transmission of bacteria responsible for the spread of disease, in such a manner to develop a group of objectives adapted to the country's specific needs in order to combat the epidemic. With the support of the Bandim Health Project, with which she would become their principal investigator.

During the COVID-19 pandemic, the University of Southern Denmark and the Institute of Hygiene and Tropical Medicines at NOVA University Lisbon created, in 2020, an investigation project whose objective was to verify if the work absenteeism of health professionals in Cape Verde, Guinea-Bissau, and Mozambique, brought on by the coronavirus, would diminish in their respective health systems' if they received the BCG vaccine. Within this scope, Rodrigues was in charge of leading the group responsible for studying its effects in Guinea-Bissau.

She was the first female director of the National Institute of Public Health of Guinea-Bissau, having led the office from 2009 to 2012. She is a member of the executive board of the International Association of National Public Health Institutes (IANPHI).

== Selected works ==
- 2001 – The pattern of cholera disease in Guinea-Bissau: risk factors and local preventive measures
- 2016 – MHealth to Improve Measles Immunization in Guinea-Bissau: Study Protocol for a Randomized Controlled Trial
- 2021 – Chronic political instability and HIV/AIDS response in Guinea-Bissau: a qualitative study
