= Monopartite =

Class of viral genome

Monopartite refers to the class of genome that is presented in the genome of the virus. As opposed to multipartite, viruses composed of monopartite genomes have a single molecule of nucleic acid. Most dsDNA viruses are monopartite.
