= Ivan Ivanovich Mavrov =

Ukrainian physician

Ivan Ivanovich Mavrov (Ukrainian: Іван Іванович Мавров, Russian: Иван Иванович Мавров, 26 June 1936 – 8 August 2009) was a Ukrainian physician.

== Life and career ==
Mavrov was born in Mariupol in 1936. In 1960 he graduated as a doctor of medical sciences from Donetsk Medical Institute. From 1960 to 1977 he held several positions, first head physician of a local rural hospital, then managing doctor of dermatovenereology branch of a large hospital, then head physician of the City dermatovenereologic clinic, and finally manager of the City Public Health Department. He then became professor and director of the Institute of Dermatology and Venereology at the Ukraine Academy of Medical Sciences, from 1977 to 2009, and manager of the Faculty of skin and venereal diseases of the Kharkiv Medical Academy of Postgraduate Education from 1984 to 2009.

Mavrov was the founder of a scientific school and the editor-in-chief of the journal Dermatology and venereology. He held 35 patents and 19 copyright certificates, and supervised eight doctoral and 37 master's theses. Mavrov's scientific research areas were Sexually Transmitted Diseases – the study of biological and genetic features of the venereal infections causative agents; functions and impairments of cell membranes at skin and venereal diseases; development of new diagnostic tests; ecological and social research.

== Publications ==
Mavrov published more than 350 scientific works on various topics in dermatology and venereology, including 12 monographs:

- Urogenital Chlamydiosis, 1983;
- Treatment and preventive maintenance of gogococcal infections, 1984;
- Microcirculation at dermatosis, 1985;
- Contact infections which are sexually transmitted, 1989;
- Sexual diseases, 1994, 2002 (sustained five editions in Ukraine and published abroad);
- HIV-infection: actual questions of clinic, diagnostics, epidemiology and preventive maintenance, 1994;
- The Herpes-virus infection, 1998, "Human qualities and human relations", 2005.

He also wrote the basic sections of manuals for doctors:

- Unification of laboratory methods of research at the sexually transmitted infections, 2001;
- Rationale diagnostics and treatment in dermatovenereology, 2007,
- Bases of diagnostics and treatment in dermatology and venereology, 2008;
- Etudes to diagnostics and treatment in dermatology and venereology, 2009.
