= Von Magnus phenomenon =

Generation of defective interfering particles by viruses

The von Magnus phenomenon describes the generation of defective interfering particles (DIPs) by viruses. It was first observed by Preben von Magnus in influenza viruses, after the serial passage of undiluted allantoic fluid in eggs.

== See also ==
- Multipartite
