= Multipartite =

Class of viruses

Multipartite viruses are viruses that have segmented nucleic acid genomes were each segment of the genome is enclosed in a separate viral particle. Only a few single-stranded DNA viruses have multipartite genomes, but many more RNA viruses have multipartite genomes. Multipartite viruses represent 35-40% of the viral genera and families that have been described in plants and fungi, but otherwise appear to be rare. It is possible for multipartite viruses to have either helical or icosahedral capsids. An advantage of multipartite viruses is their ability to synthesize multiple mRNA strands to avoid the cellular constraint of monocistronicity. It is not known whether multipartite viruses can efficiently infect a single cell with all of their genome segments, which is generally thought to be necessary for replication. Recent research has suggested that, contrary to this belief, it is possible that the genome segments do not have infect the same cell in a plant system. Rather, viral genome segments and gene products may accumulate in different cells and come into contact through the exchange of material between cells. This implies that multipartite viruses are not localized in space but are more like a distributed network of chemical reactions.

== See also ==
- Monopartite
- Nanovirus#Structure and genome
- Von Magnus phenomenon
