= Christine Stabell Benn =

Danish physician and global health researcher

- Citizenship: Denmark
- Education: University of Copenhagen
- Known for: Research on non-specific effects of vaccines
- Awards: George Macdonald Medal (2023); Knight of the Order of the Dannebrog (2025)
- Scientific career
- Fields: Global health, epidemiology, vaccinology
- Workplaces: University of Southern Denmark; Bandim Health Project; Danish Institute for Advanced Study

Christine Stabell Benn is an epidemiologist and professor of global health at the University of Southern Denmark. She is chair of the Danish Institute for Advanced Study and has worked with the Bandim Health Project in Guinea-Bissau since 1993. Her research has focused on childhood health interventions, vitamin A supplementation and the proposed non-specific effects of vaccines.

Benn was elected a member of the Academia Europaea in 2020, received the George Macdonald Medal in 2023 and was appointed Knight of the Order of the Dannebrog in 2025.

== Education and career ==
Benn received her medical degree from the University of Copenhagen in 1996, followed by a PhD in 2003 and a Doctor of Medical Science degree in 2011. She undertook postdoctoral work at Rigshospitalet in Copenhagen and at Stanford University in the United States.

Benn joined the Bandim Health Project as a medical student in 1993. Her early research examined whether vitamin A supplementation influenced the immune response to measles vaccination. She subsequently conducted research into the broader health effects of vaccines and nutritional interventions in Guinea-Bissau and Denmark.

In 2010, Benn received a European Research Council Starting Grant. In 2012, the Danish National Research Foundation selected her to establish and lead the Research Center for Vitamins and Vaccines. She became professor of global health at the University of Southern Denmark in 2013 and chair of the Danish Institute for Advanced Study in 2017.

== Research ==
Benn's research has examined whether vaccines and vitamins may affect overall morbidity and mortality in ways that extend beyond their recognised effects on the diseases or deficiencies they are intended to prevent. She has led or participated in randomised trials involving vitamin A supplementation, BCG vaccine, oral polio vaccine and early measles vaccination.

Benn and her collaborators, including Peter Aaby, have argued that some vaccines may produce beneficial or harmful effects against infections unrelated to their intended targets and that these effects may differ between males and females. The interpretation, clinical significance and public-health implications of the proposed effects remain debated.

=== Methodological criticism ===
A 2025 commentary in the journal Vaccine reviewed randomised trials conducted by the Bandim Health Project. Its authors argued that the reported primary outcomes generally did not substantiate some of the broader claims made about non-specific vaccine effects and raised concerns about outcome reporting, secondary analyses and statistical power.

Benn and Aaby disputed the analysis and asked the journal to retract the commentary. The journal declined the request. In 2026, Science and KFF Health News reported that allegations concerning the reporting of data from earlier trials had been referred by the University of Southern Denmark to Denmark's Board on Research Misconduct. Benn denied that her team had withheld contradictory results and described the criticism of its work as flawed.

=== Proposed hepatitis B vaccine trial ===
In December 2025, the United States Centers for Disease Control and Prevention awarded approximately US$1.6 million to the University of Southern Denmark for a proposed study of the timing of the hepatitis B vaccine birth dose in Guinea-Bissau. Benn was identified as one of the leaders of the research team.

The proposed randomised trial was intended to enrol approximately 14,000 newborns. One group would receive the vaccine at birth, while the other would follow the country's existing schedule and receive it later. Researchers intended to examine mortality, illness and developmental outcomes.

The study attracted criticism from public-health researchers who argued that withholding the birth dose from some newborns would expose them to preventable infection. The Bandim research team responded that Guinea-Bissau did not routinely administer the vaccine at birth and argued that the study would evaluate the vaccine before the country's planned introduction of a universal birth dose.

In January 2026, the government of Guinea-Bissau suspended the study pending an ethical and technical review after its health minister said that the committee associated with its original approval had not formally met to evaluate it.

The World Health Organization subsequently stated that it had significant concerns about the study's scientific justification, ethical safeguards and compliance with accepted principles for research involving human participants. In March 2026, the University of Southern Denmark said it had paused all work associated with the proposed trial while seeking an independent ethical evaluation. United States health officials stated that the study remained under review and could proceed only after approval from the relevant authorities.

== Awards and honours ==
- University of Southern Denmark Innovation Prize, 2019
- Elected member of the Academia Europaea, 2020
- George Macdonald Medal, awarded by the Royal Society of Tropical Medicine and Hygiene and the London School of Hygiene and Tropical Medicine, 2023
- Knight of the Order of the Dannebrog, 2025

== See also ==
- Bandim Health Project
- Non-specific effect of vaccines
- Peter Aaby
- Vaccine hesitancy
