= Centre for International Health =

Norwegian research centre

Centre for International Health (CIH) at the University of Bergen (UiB) was established in 1988. Since January 2013 the Centre is part of the Department of Global Public Health and Primary Care at the Faculty of Medicine.

== Purpose and overview ==
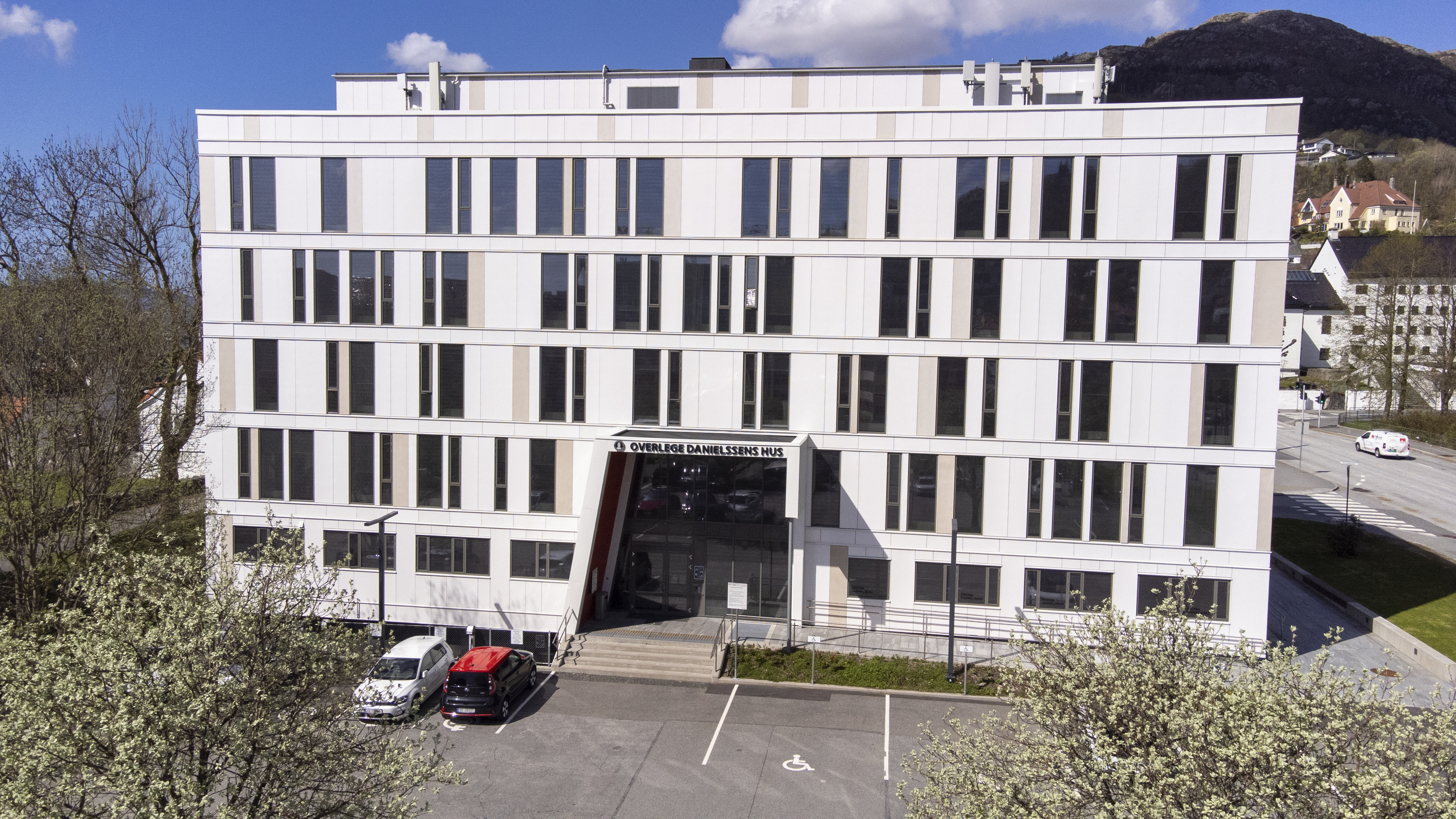
The Centre for International Health is since 2008 located in Overlege Danielssens Building, not far from the Haukeland University Hospital, Bergen, Norway

The Centre for International Health was established as a strategic unit for development-related research, education and leadership development on Global Health issues. The Centre for International Health has a particular obligation to initiate, co-ordinate and conduct research and capacity building of importance for the collaboration between the University of Bergen and low-income countries in the field of health.

The Centre has an extensive network of partners in low and middle income countries such as: Burkina Faso, Cambodia, Democratic Republic of Congo, Ethiopia, India, Kenya, Malawi, Nepal, Pakistan, South Africa, Sudan, Tanzania, Uganda, Vietnam, and Zambia.

== Academic staff ==
Professor Bjarne Bjorvatn was the initiator and the director of the Centre from 1988. Since then, the Centre has been led by the professors Gunnar Kvåle, Bernt Lindtjørn, Rune Nilsen, Knut Fylkesnes, and, since 1 September 2013, by professor Bente Moen.

The Centre has (as of August 2021) the following permanent professors:

- Ingunn Engebretsen
- Sven Gudmund Hinderaker
- Bente E. Moen
- Karen Marie Moland
- Tehmina Mustafa
- Bjarne Robberstad
- David Sam
- Ingvild F Sandøy
- Halvor Sommerfelt
- Cecilie Svanes
- Thorkild Tylleskär

Emeriti:

- Bernt Lindtjørn
- Knut Fylkesnes, emeritus
- Gunnar Kvåle, emeritus
- Odd Mørkve, emeritus
- Rune Nilsen, emeritus
- Bjarne Bjorvatn, emeritus

== Bergen Global and Bergen Summer Research School (BSRS) ==
Among its many initiatives, the University of Bergen’s Centre for International Health also coordinates Global Challenges, one of the university’s three “cross-Faculty strategic focus areas,” which annually organizes Bergen Summer Research School (BSRS), with its interdisciplinary selection of intensive, international PhD courses. The BSRS is a consortium of research institutions in the greater Bergen area, described as “a joint venture under the leadership of the University of Bergen with NHH Norwegian School of Economics, Western Norway University of Applied Sciences, Chr. Michelsen Institute and NORCE Norwegian Research Centre AS”. Each year, approximately 100 PhD students from around 40 countries worldwide participate in BSRS, which emphasizes interdisciplinary studies at the intersection of science and policy-making. BSRS is currently directed by anthropologist Edvard Hviding (2019), and recent directors have included medical researcher/ethicist Ole Frithjof Norheim (2018), anthropologist Tore Sætersdal (2017), and geographer Terje Tvedt (2016).
