= Gregory Poland =

American physician and vaccinologist

Gregory A. Poland
- Education: Illinois Wesleyan University (BA); Westminster Theological Seminary (MA); Southern Illinois University School of Medicine (MD)
- Occupations: Physician, vaccinologist
- Medical career
- Institutions: Mayo Clinic
- Awards: Secretary of Defense Medal for Outstanding Public Service (2004); Master of the American College of Physicians (2008)

Gregory A. Poland is an American physician and vaccinologist. He is a professor of medicine at the Mayo Clinic in Rochester, Minnesota, as well as the director of the Mayo Clinic's Vaccine Research Group. He is also the editor-in-chief of the medical journal Vaccine.

== Education ==
Poland received his BA in biology from Illinois Wesleyan University in 1977 where he was a member of Sigma Pi fraternity. He received his MD from the Southern Illinois University School of Medicine in 1980. Poland also received an MA in theology from Westminster Theological Seminary.

== Career ==
Poland is a vaccinologist and expert in the prevention of infectious diseases. He became a physician in 1980. He is a professor of medicine, infectious diseases, molecular pharmacology, and experimental therapeutics at Mayo Clinic. He founded and directs Mayo Clinic's Vaccine Research Group, which the Southern Illinois University School of Medicine (SIUSOM) has said "created the field of viral vaccine immunogenetics and the immune response network theory, helping develop novel vaccines important to public health". He is the co-director of the Atria Research and Global Health Institute.

Poland has been a medical advisor to four U.S. presidents, including Joe Biden. World has credited him for providing "consultative advice to nearly every Western vaccine manufacturer", including Moderna and Pfizer. He has advocated for universal influenza vaccination. He also coined the term "adversomics". As of 2021, Poland and his daughter Caroline, who is a licensed mental health counselor, have been studying ways to improve COVID-19 and other vaccine acceptance. In 2025, Poland said the Vaccine Adverse Events Reporting System should be strengthened and "large, ongoing studies are needed to help researchers work out who is at increased risk of vaccine injuries and how to reduce that risk", according to the Australian Broadcasting Corporation.

Poland has also been the president of the Armed Forces Epidemiological Board and was appointed as the president of the Defense Health Board by U.S. President George W. Bush. In 2009, Poland was the chair of the American College of Physicians' Adult Immunization Advisory Board. Poland served multiple terms on the Centers for Disease Control and Prevention's Advisory Committee on Immunization Practices, as well as a liaison for the National Vaccine Advisory Committee and on the Food and Drug Administration's Vaccine and Regulatory Advisory Committee.

== Research and activism ==
Poland is known for researching the immunogenetics of responses to certain vaccines, including smallpox vaccines. He has also written about the negative impacts of the false claim that the MMR vaccine might cause autism, and is an outspoken advocate of mandatory influenza vaccination. After developing tinnitus after his COVID vaccination he has called for better safety studies.

== Honors and awards ==
Poland was awarded the Secretary of Defense Medal for Outstanding Public Service by President George W. Bush and Donald Rumsfeld, the United States Secretary of Defense, for his work related to biodefense and infectious diseases prevention. Poland has also received a MERIT Award from the NIH, a Department of Medicine Lifetime Research Achievement Award from the Mayo Clinic, and a distinguished alumni award from SIUSOM.
