= Ministry of Public Health (Guinea-Bissau) =

Ministry of Guinea-Bissau

- Ministério da Saúde

Ministry overview
- Jurisdiction: Guinea-Bissau
- Website: www.guinebissaurepublic.com/health-2/

The Ministry of Public Health is a ministry of the government of Guinea-Bissau. It consists of four public health agencies: the National Public Health Laboratory, the MOH Center for Epidemiology and Community Health, the National School of Public Health, and the Center for Tropical Medicine. It employs between 200 and 500 people.

== See also ==
- Health in Guinea-Bissau
