= Defective interfering particle =

Defective viral particles

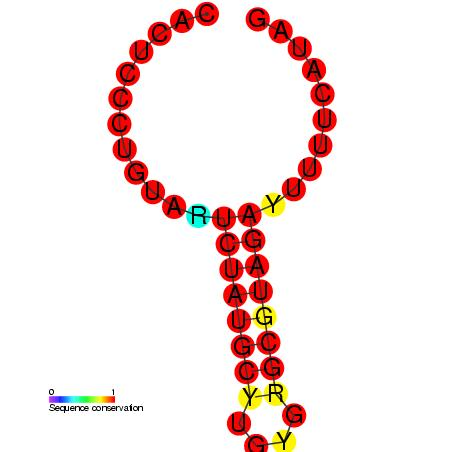
Predicted secondary structure of the Coronavirus SL-III cis-acting replication element, a genomic structure required for BCoV DI RNA replication

Defective interfering particles (DIPs), also known as defective interfering viruses, are spontaneously generated virus mutants in which a critical portion of the particle's genome has been lost due to defective replication or non-homologous recombination. The mechanism of their formation is presumed to be as a result of template-switching during replication of the viral genome, although non-replicative mechanisms involving direct ligation of genomic RNA fragments have also been proposed. DIPs are derived from and associated with their parent virus, and particles are classed as DIPs if they are rendered non-infectious due to at least one essential gene of the virus being lost or severely damaged as a result of the defection. A DIP can usually still penetrate host cells, but requires another fully functional virus particle (the 'helper' virus) to co-infect a cell with it, in order to provide the lost factors.

DIPs were first observed as early as the 1950s by Von Magnus and Schlesinger, both working with influenza viruses. However, direct evidence for DIPs was only found in the 1960s by Hackett who noticed presence of 'stumpy' particles of vesicular stomatitis virus in electron micrographs and the formalization of DIPs terminology was in 1970 by Huang and Baltimore. DIPs can occur within nearly every class of both DNA and RNA viruses both in clinical and laboratory settings including poliovirus, SARS coronavirus, measles, alphaviruses, respiratory syncytial virus and influenza virus.

== Defection ==
DIPs are a naturally occurring phenomenon that can be recreated under experimental conditions in the lab and can also be synthesized for experimental use. They are spontaneously produced by error-prone viral replication, something particularly prevalent in RNA viruses over DNA viruses due to the enzyme used (replicase, or RNA-dependent RNA polymerase.) DIP genomes typically retain the terminal sequences needed for recognition by viral polymerases, and sequences for packaging of their genome into new particles, but little else. The size of the genomic deletion event can vary greatly, with one such example in a DIP derived from rabies virus exhibiting a 6.1 kb deletion. In another example, the size of several DI-DNA plant virus genomes varied from one tenth of the size of the original genome to one half.

== Interference ==
The particles are considered interfering when they affect the function of the parent virus through competitive inhibition during coinfection. In other words, defective and non-defective viruses replicate simultaneously, but when defective particles increase, the amount of replicated non-defective virus is decreased. The extent of interference depends on the type and size of defection in the genome; large deletions of genomic data allow rapid replication of the defective genome. In SARS-CoV-2, synthetic DIPs made by removing 90% of the genome replicate three times faster than the virus. During the coinfection of a host cell, a critical ratio will eventually be reached in which more viral factors are being used to produce the non-infectious DIPs than infectious particles. Defective particles and defective genomes have also been demonstrated to stimulate the host innate immune responses and their presence during a viral infection correlates with the strength of the antiviral response. However, in some viruses such as SARS-CoV-2, the effect of competitive inhibition by interfering particles reduces viral-mediated innate immune responses and inflammation producing a therapeutic effect.

This interfering nature is becoming more and more important for research on virus therapies. It is thought that because of their specificity, DIPs will be targeted to sites of infection. In one example, scientists have used DIPs to create "protecting viruses", which attenuated the pathogenicity of an influenza A infection in mice, through inducing an interferon response, to a point that it was no longer lethal. For SARS-CoV-2, the first synthetic DIPs were made in 2020 and the interference effect was used to generate therapeutic interfering particles (TIPs) that reduced pathogenesis and protected hamsters from serious disease.

== Pathogenesis ==
DIPs have been shown to play a role in pathogenesis of certain viruses. One study demonstrates the relationship between a pathogen and its defective variant, showing how regulation of DI production allowed the virus to attenuate its own infectious replication, decreasing viral load and thus enhance its parasitic efficiency by preventing the host from dying too fast. This also provides the virus with more time to spread and infect new hosts. DIP generation is regulated within viruses: the Coronavirus SL-III cis-acting replication element (shown in the image) is a higher-order genomic structure implicated in the mediation of DIP production in bovine coronavirus, with apparent homologs detected in other coronavirus groups. A more in-depth introduction can be found in Alice Huang and David Baltimore's work from 1970.

== Types of defective RNA genomes ==
1. Deletions defections are when a fragment of the template is skipped. Examples of this type of defection can be found in tomato spotted wilt virus and Flock House virus.
2. Snapbacks defections are when replicase transcribes part of one strand then uses this new strand as a template. The result of this can produce a hairpin. Snapback defections have been observed in vesicular stomatitis virus.
3. Panhandle defections are when the polymerase carries a partially made strand and then switches back to transcribe the 5' end, forming the panhandle shape. Panhandle defections are found in influenza viruses.
4. Compound defections are when both a deletion and snapback defection happens together.
5. Mosaic or complex DI genome, in which the various regions may come from the same helper virus genome but in the wrong order; from different helper genome segments, or could include segments of host RNA. Duplications may also occur.

== Research ==
Research has been conducted by virologists to learn more about the interference in infection of host cells and how DI genomes could potentially work as immunostimulatory antiviral agents. Another branch of research has pursued the concept of engineering DIPs into antiviral therapeutic interfering particles (TIPs), a purely theoretical concept until recently. A 2014 article describes the pre-clinical work to test the immunostimulatory effectiveness of a DIP against influenza viruses by inducing the innate antiviral immune responses (i.e., interferon). Subsequent work tested the pre-clinical efficacy of TIPs against HIV and SARS-CoV-2. DI-RNAs have also been found to aid in the infection of fungi via viruses of the family Partitiviridae for the first time, which makes room for more interdisciplinary work.

Several tools as ViReMa and DI-tector have been developed to help to detect defective viral genomes in next-generation sequencing data and high-throughput approaches, such as random-deletion library sequencing (RanDeL-Seq), allow rational mapping of the viral genetic elements that are required for DI-particle propagation.
