= Hospital Nacional Simão Mendes =

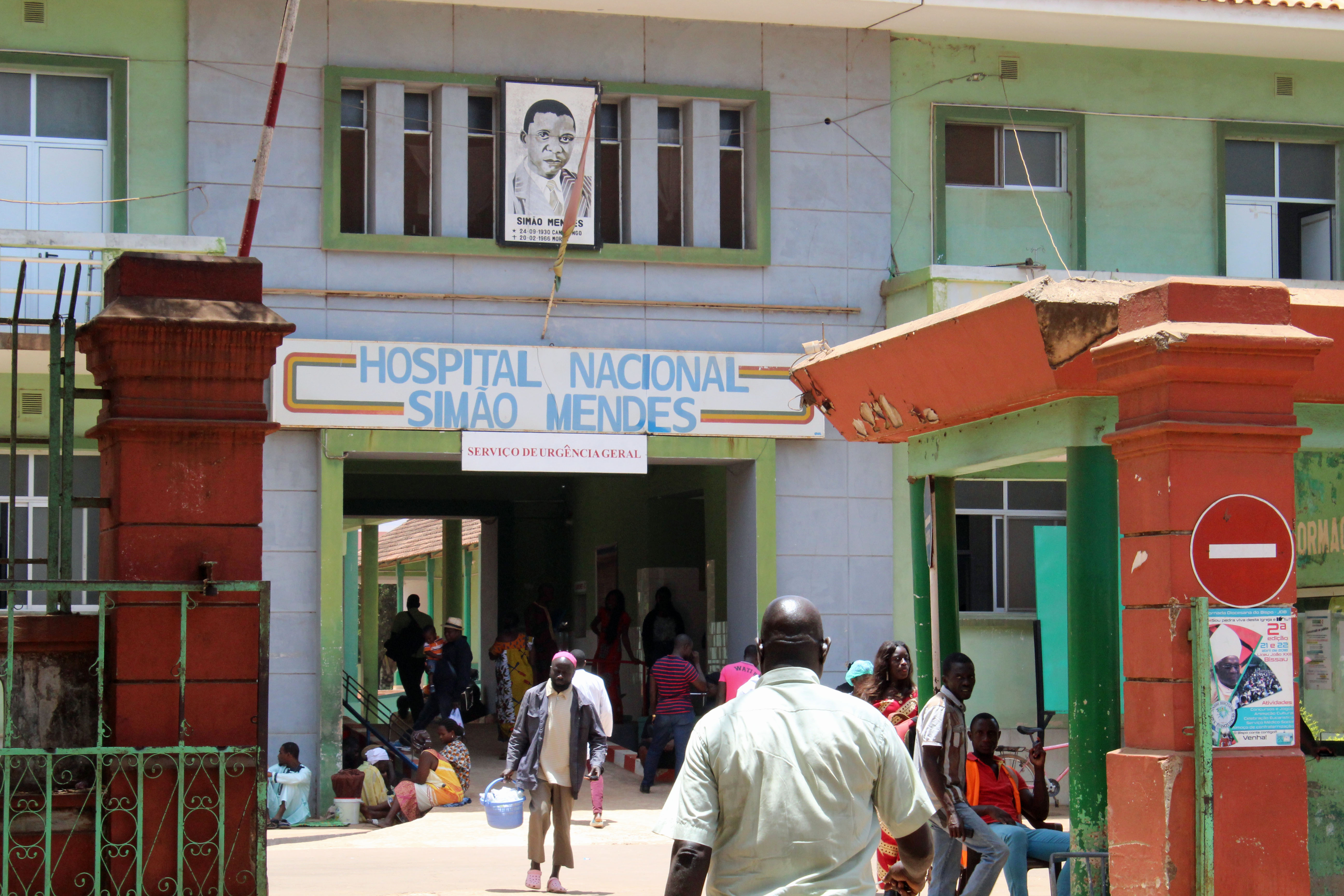
- National hospital Simão Mendes, 2020

Geography
- Location: Bissau, Guinea-Bissau
- Coordinates: 11°51′51″N 15°34′48″W

Organisation
- Type: National Hospital

Services
- Beds: more than 500 (2018)

Links
- Lists: Hospitals in Guinea-Bissau

Hospital Nacional Simão Mendes is a hospital in Bissau, Guinea-Bissau. It is situated next to the cemetery. It is named after António Simões Mendes (1930–1966), a nurse born in Canchungo who treated PAICG fighters during the War of Independence, was jailed by PIDE in 1961 and killed in a Portuguese Air Force raid in February 1966. As of 1998, the hospital contained the only paediatric ward in the country. In 2009–2011, it underwent significant redevelopment. In 2011, it contained 417 beds and offered 21 specialisations, of which the maternity ward, pediatrics, ophtalmology, radiology and the laboratory were the most sought after. At the time it had 41 doctors and 82 nurses. On 20 October 2016, a factory for medicinal oxygen was inaugurated on the hospital site. At the end of 2018, the hospital had more than 500 beds, and one doctor was specialised in cardiology. The Paediatric Ward had 158 beds and counted with 9 doctors and 40 nurses.
