= Non-specific effect of vaccines =

Unintended side effects of vaccines which may be beneficial or bad

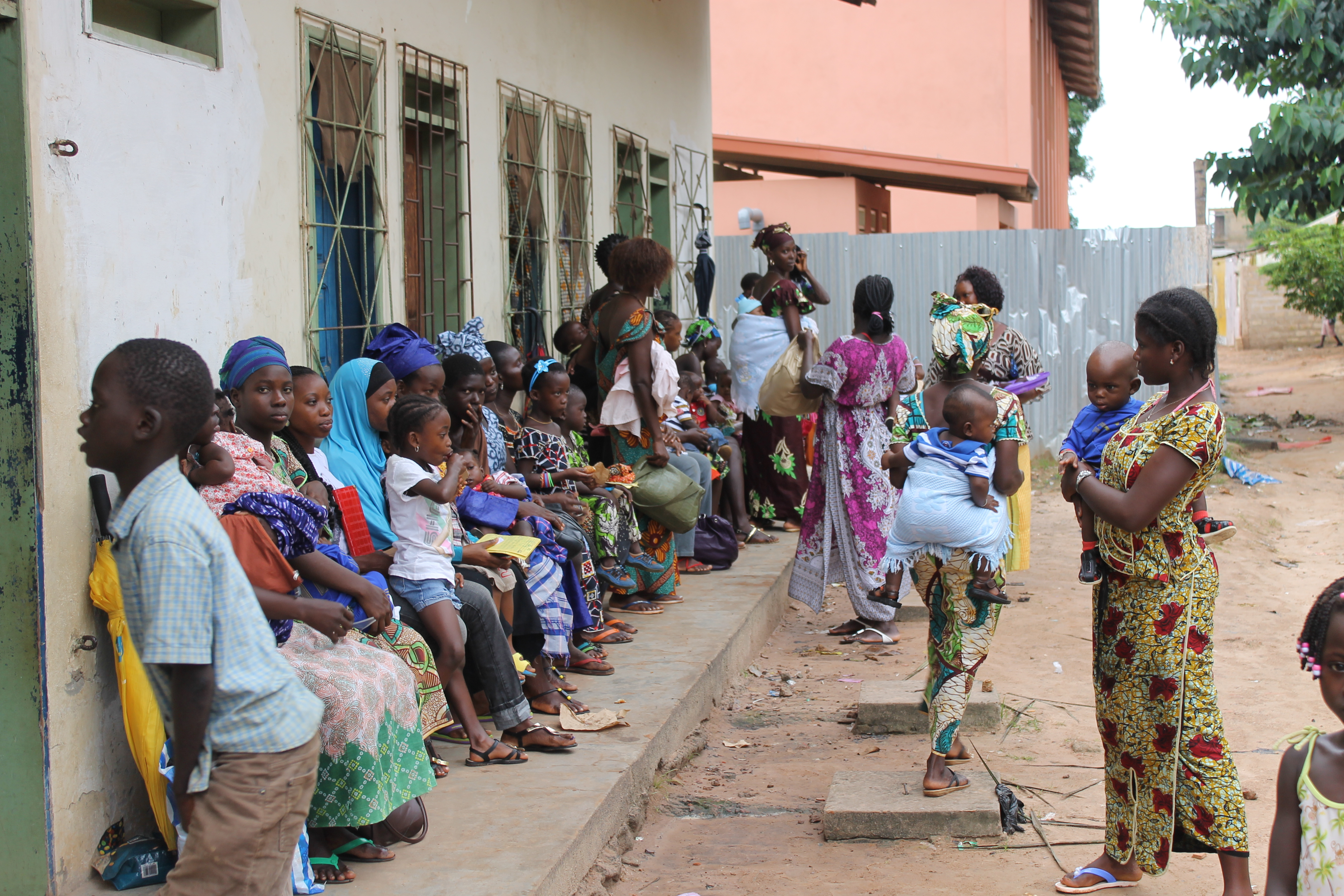
Women and children in line for a vaccination in Guinea-Bissau. It is estimated that millions of child deaths could be prevented every year if the non-specific effects of vaccines were taken into consideration in immunization programs.

Non-specific effects of vaccines (also called "heterologous effects" or "off-target effects") are effects which go beyond the specific protective effects against the targeted diseases. Non-specific effects from live vaccines can be strongly beneficial by increasing protection against non-targeted infections. This has been shown with childhood mortality in two live attenuated vaccines, BCG vaccine and measles vaccine, through multiple randomized controlled trials. Non-specific effects of non-live vaccination may be detrimental, increasing overall mortality at least 30% by some estimates, despite providing protection against the target disease. Observational studies suggest that diphtheria-tetanus-pertussis vaccine (DTP) may be highly detrimental, and although a WHO report described such studies as at high risk of bias, the direction of such bias was not predicted; although the conclusions have failed to replicate in some similar studies conducted by independent groups, randomized controlled trials (RCTs) provide additional evidence that vaccines have potent nonspecific effects.

Ongoing research suggests that non-specific effects of vaccines may depend on the vaccine, the vaccination sequence, and the sex of the infant. For example, one hypothesis suggests that all live attenuated vaccines reduce mortality more than explained by prevention of target infections, while all inactivated vaccines may increase overall mortality despite providing protection against the target disease. These effects may be long-lasting, at least up to the time point where a new type of vaccine is given. The non-specific effects can be very pronounced, with significant effects on overall mortality and morbidity. In a situation with herd immunity to the target disease, the non-specific effects can be more important for overall health than the specific vaccine effects.

The non-specific effects should not be confused with the side effects of vaccines (such as local reactions at the site of vaccination or general reactions such as fever, head ache or rash, which usually resolve within days to weeks – or in rare cases anaphylaxis). Rather, non-specific effects represent a form of general immunomodulation, with important consequences for the immune system's ability to handle subsequent challenges.

It is estimated that millions of child deaths in low income countries could be prevented every year if the non-specific effects of vaccines were taken into consideration in immunization programs. Although childhood mortality is an important metric, non-specific effects have also been observed for vaccination events and conditions that occur much later in life.

== History ==
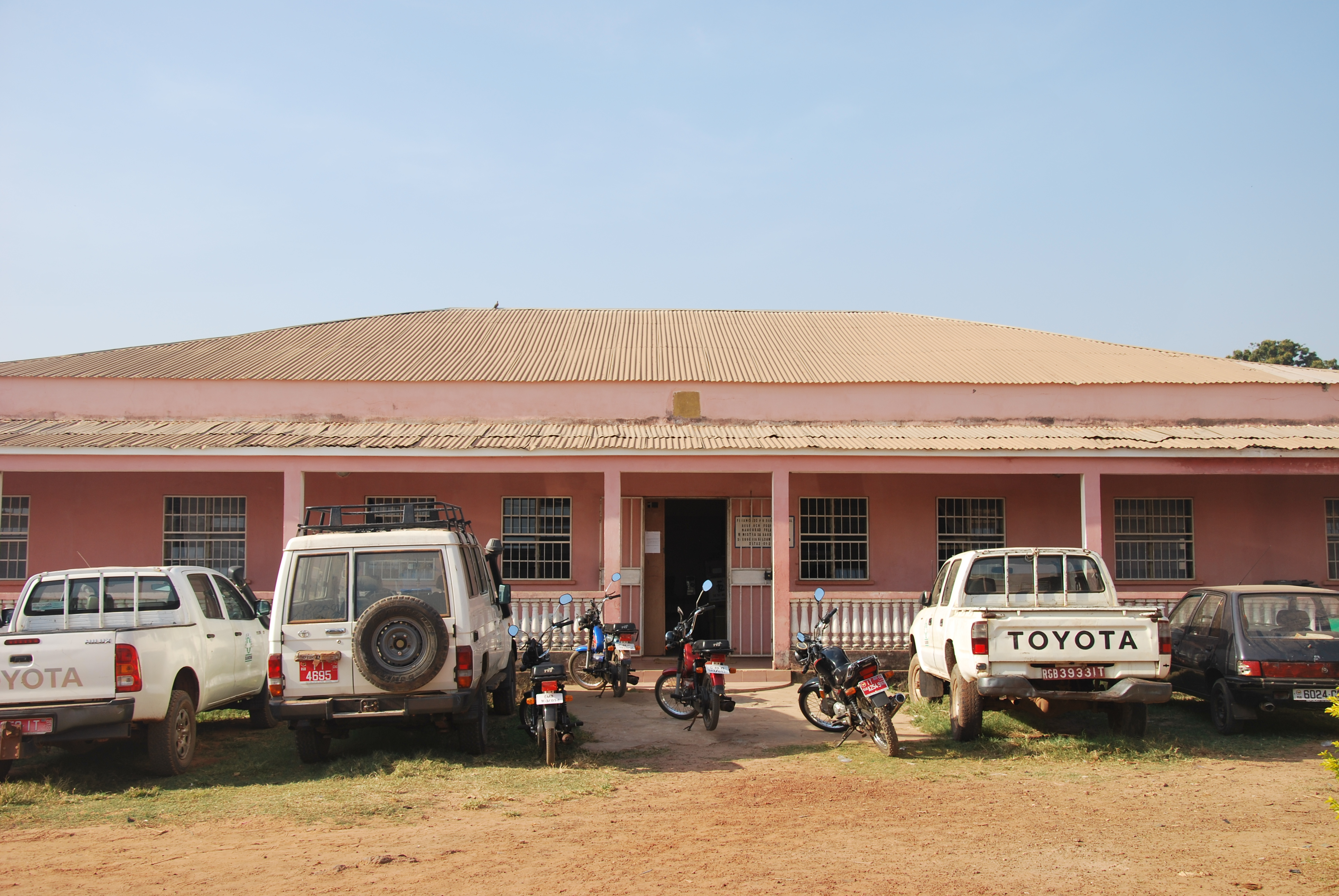
The Bandim Health Project Office built in 2008.

The hypothesis that vaccines have non-specific effects was formulated in the early 1990s by Peter Aaby at the Bandim Health Project in West Africa.

The first indication of the importance of the non-specific effects of vaccines came in a series of randomized controlled trials (RCTs) in the late 1980s. It was tested whether a high-titer (high concentration) measles vaccine (HTMV) given at 4–6 months of age was as effective against measles infection as the standard measles vaccine (MV) given at 9 months of age. Early administration of the HTMV prevented measles infection just as effectively as did the standard MV given at 9 months of age.

However, early administration of the HTMV was associated with twofold higher overall mortality among females (there was no difference in mortality for males). In other words, the girls given HTMV died more often despite having the same protection against measles as the infants given standard MV. The discovery forced WHO to withdraw the HTMV in 1992. It was later discovered that it was not the HTMV, but rather a subsequent inactivated vaccine (DTP or IPV for different children), that caused the increase in female mortality. Although the mechanism was different than initially thought, this finding represents unexpected effects of a change in the vaccine program not attributable to the disease-specific protection provided by the vaccines.

This first observation that vaccines could protect against the target disease but at the same time affect mortality after infection with other pathogens, in a sex-differential manner, led to several further studies showing that other vaccines might also have such nonspecific effects.

== Live attenuated versus inactivated vaccines ==
Numerous observational studies and randomised trials (RCTs) have found that the impact on mortality of live and inactivated vaccines differ markedly. All live vaccines studied so far (BCG, measles vaccine, oral polio vaccine (OPV) and smallpox vaccine) have been shown to reduce mortality more than can be explained by prevention of the targeted infection(s). In contrast, inactivated vaccines (diphtheria-tetanus-pertussis (DTP), hepatitis B, inactivated polio vaccine) may have deleterious effects in spite of providing target disease protection.

=== BCG vaccine ===
The live attenuated BCG vaccine developed against tuberculosis has been shown to have strong beneficial effects on the ability to combat non-tuberculosis infections.

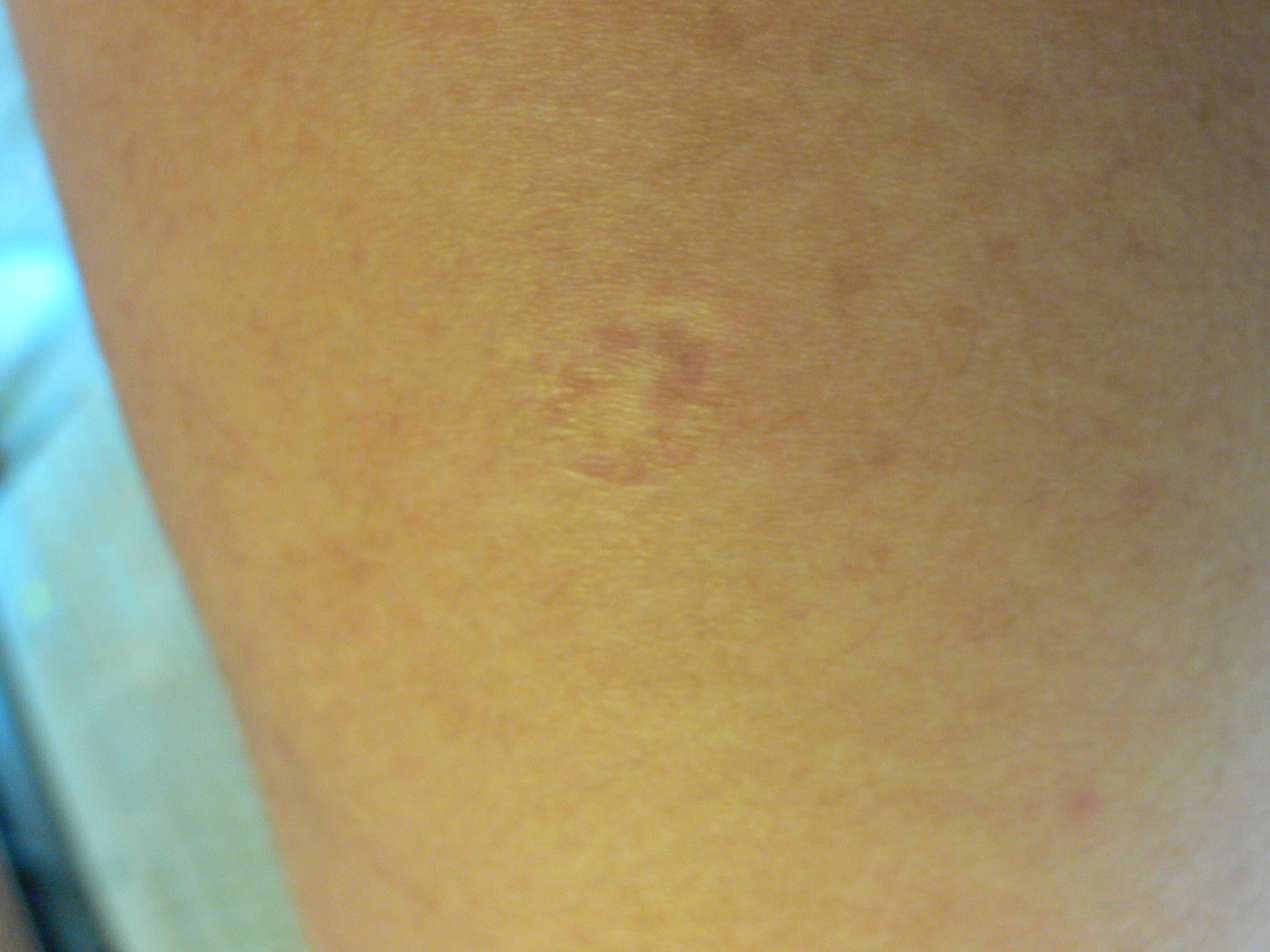
Scar after BCG vaccination

Several studies have suggested that BCG vaccination may reduce atopy, particularly when given early in life. Furthermore, in multiple observational studies BCG vaccination has been shown to provide beneficial effects on overall mortality. These observations encouraged randomised controlled trials to examine BCG vaccination's beneficial non-specific effects on overall health. Since BCG vaccination is recommended to be given at birth in countries that have a high incidence of tuberculosis it would have been unethical to randomize children into "BCG" vs. "no BCG" groups. However, many low-income countries delay BCG vaccination for low-birth-weight (LBW) infants; this offered the opportunity to directly test the effect of BCG on overall mortality.

In the first two randomised controlled trials receipt of BCG+OPV at birth vs. OPV only ('delayed BCG') was associated with strong reductions in neonatal mortality; these effects were seen as early as 3 days after vaccination. BCG protected against sepsis as well as respiratory infections. Among BCG vaccinated children, those who develop a BCG scar or a positive skin test (TST) are less likely to develop sepsis and exhibit an overall reduction in child mortality of around 50%.

In a recent WHO-commissioned review based on five clinical trials and nine observational studies, it was concluded that "the results indicated a beneficial effect of BCG on overall mortality in the first 6–12 months of life. Relevant follow-up in some of the trials was short, and all of the observational studies were regarded as being at risk of bias, so the confidence in the findings was rated as very low according to the GRADE criteria and "There was a suggestion that BCG vaccination may be more beneficial the earlier it is given". Furthermore, "estimated effects are in the region of a halving of mortality risk" and "any effect of BCG vaccine on all-cause mortality is not likely to be attributable to any great extent to fewer deaths from tuberculosis (i.e. to a specific effect of BCG vaccine against tuberculosis)". Based on the evidence, the WHO's Strategic Group of Experts on Immunization (SAGE) concluded that "the non-specific effects on all-cause mortality warrant further research".

=== Polio vaccine ===
The oral polio vaccine (OPV) was developed in the 1950s by Dr. Albert Sabin and is made from live attenuated polioviruses of three serotypes. The first evidence of non-specific effects of OPV was protection by vaccination with OPV of serotype 2 against disease caused by serotype 1 poliovirus without any evidence of cross-neutralization. Vaccination with trivalent OPV helped to stop outbreak of paralytic disease caused by Enterovirus 71 in Bulgaria. In large prospective clinical trials OPV was shown to protect against seasonal influenza and other acute respiratory diseases. Immunization with OPV was also shown to lead to a faster healing of genital herpes lesions. Immunization with OPV was found to reduce all-cause childhood mortality even in the absence of wild poliovirus circulation, hospital admission rate, incidence of bacterial diarrhea, and otitis media. Vaccination with OPV results in Interferon induction that is believed to be the main mediator of the non-specific protective effects of OPV.

=== Measles vaccine ===
Standard titer measles vaccine is recommended at 9 months of age in low-income countries where measles infection is endemic and often fatal. Many observational studies have shown that measles-vaccinated children have substantially lower mortality than can be explained by the prevention of measles-related deaths. Many of these observational studies were natural experiments, such as studies comparing the mortality before and after the introduction of measles vaccine and other studies where logistical factors rather than maternal choice determined whether a child was vaccinated or not.

These findings were later explored in a randomized trial from 2003 to 2009 in Guinea-Bissau. An intervention group of children given standard titer measles vaccine at 4.5 and 9 month of age compared with two control groups which received either Edmonston-Zagreb or Schwarts measles vaccine at 9 months and nothing at 4.5 months (including no placebo). The co-primary outcomes for mortality at comparisons 9-36 months and 4.5-9 months of age were prespecified but not corrected for multiple testing. Post-hoc analysis of a third primary mortality outcome with the comparison 4.5-36 months of age showed in per protocol analysis a insignificant 30% reduction in all-cause mortality compared to the children in the control group. No correction of multiple testing was mentioned either. The overall findings of the pre-specified co-primary outcomes showed even without correction for multiple testing no effect of an additional early dose of measles vaccine. In summary the RCT did not find evidence of a non-specific effect of an extra early dose of measles vaccine.

In a recent WHO-commissioned review based on four randomized trials and 18 observational studies, it was concluded that "There was consistent evidence of a beneficial effect of measles vaccine, although all observational studies were assessed as being at risk of bias and the GRADE rating was of low confidence. There was an apparent difference between the effect in girls and boys, with girls benefitting more from measles vaccination", and furthermore "estimated effects are in the region of a halving of mortality risk" and "if these effects are real then they are not fully explained by deaths that were established as due to measles". Based on the evidence, the Strategic Group of Experts on Immunization concluded that "the non-specific effects on all-cause mortality warrant further research".

=== Diphtheria-tetanus-pertussis vaccine ===
DTP vaccine against diphtheria, tetanus and pertussis does not seem to have the same beneficial effects as BCG, measles vaccine, OPV and smallpox vaccine, and in fact opposite effects are observed. The negative effects are seen as long as DTP vaccine is the most recent vaccine. BCG or measles vaccine given after DTP reverses the negative effects of DTP. The negative effects are seen mostly in females.

The negative effects are found in several observational studies. However, six WHO-commissioned studies concluded that there were strong beneficial effects of DTP on overall mortality. However, controversy ensued as these studies had important methodological shortcomings. For example, the WHO-commissioned studies had counted "no information about vaccination" as "unvaccinated", and they had retrospectively updated vaccine information from surviving children, while no similar update could be made for dead children, creating a so-called "survival bias" which will always produce highly beneficial effect estimates for the most recent vaccine.

In a recent WHO-commissioned review of DTP based on ten observational studies, it was concluded that, "the findings were inconsistent, with a majority of the studies indicating a detrimental effect of DTP, and two studies indicating a beneficial effect. All of the studies were regarded as being at risk of bias, so the confidence in the findings was rated as very low according to the GRADE criteria."

Furthermore, "three observational studies provided a suggestion that simultaneous administration of BCG and DTP may be preferable to the recommended schedule of BCG before DTP; and there was suggestion that mortality risk may be higher when DTP is given with, or after, measles vaccine compared with when it is given before measles vaccine (from five, and three, observational studies, respectively). These results are consistent with hypotheses that DTP vaccine may have detrimental effects on mortality, although a majority of the evidence was generated by a group centred in Guinea-Bissau who have often written in defence of such a hypothesis."

A large cohort study of over one million Danish children came to the opposite conclusion that the group of children with fewer DTP vaccinations (without MMR) experienced increased mortality.

=== Smallpox vaccine ===
When smallpox vaccine was introduced in the early 19th century, there were anecdotal descriptions of non-specific beneficial effects. In the second half of the 20th century the potential for beneficial non-specific effects of smallpox vaccine was reviewed, and new evidence on "para-immune effects" was added. More recent studies have focused on the phasing out of smallpox vaccine in the 1970s and compared vaccinated and unvaccinated cohorts.

Smallpox vaccine leaves a very characteristic scar. In low-income countries, having a smallpox vaccine scar has been associated with reductions of more than 40% in overall mortality among adults; in high-income countries smallpox vaccination has been associated with a tendency for reduced risk of asthma, and significantly reduced risk of melanoma and infectious disease hospitalizations. There are no studies that contradict these observations. However no randomized trials testing the effect of smallpox vaccine on overall mortality and morbidity have been conducted.

== Beyond childhood ==
Nonspecific effects are also observed with vaccines taken in adulthood as well as for conditions that potentially develop later in life.

BCG modulates a wide range of immune processes and has encouraging effects in mouse models, some of which may be translatable to humans. It has been studied for:

- Diabetes: repeated post-hoc BCG vaccination on people with type 1 diabetes (T1D) produces lasting reduction of HbA1c%, but it has no effect on T2D patients. Childhood BCG may lower the risk of type 1 diabetes.
- COVID-19: a 2024 systmatic review of 12 RCTs reports that BCG does not help protect against COVID-19. Follow up of one of the BCG-COVID trials (BATTLE) shows positive results in preventing long COVID.
- Dementia: observational evidence suggest that intravesical (injected into the bladder) BCG use, a treatment for bladder cancer, is associated with lower rates of future dementia. A variety of other vaccines (as well as the alum adjuvant) may also have an effect.

The zoster vaccines have a protective effect against dementia, which may be partly explained by the specific effect of it preventing the activation of its target, a virus that attacks neurons. Unlike the vaccines of chilehood, the live-attenuated zoster vaccine produces less protection than the recombinant protein subunit vaccine. The recombinant vaccine uses an adjuvant called AS01. Unexpectedly, the AS01-containing RSV vaccine (Arexvy) shows a very similar reduction in dementia risks, suggesting a nonspecific effect of the adjuvant.

== Additional variables ==
=== Sex differences ===
Non-specific effects are frequently different in males and females. There are accumulating data illustrating that males and females may respond differently to vaccination, both in terms of the quality and quantity of the immune response.

=== Interactions between health interventions ===
The non-specific effects of vaccines can be boosted or diminished when other immunomodulating health interventions such as other vaccines, or vitamins, are provided. Examples include vitamin A possibly boosting the nonspecific effect and live vaccination after DPT cancelling out its apparent negative effect.

=== Influence of pre-existing specific immunity ===
The beneficial non-specific effects of live vaccines are stronger with earlier vaccination, possibly due to maternal antibodies. Boosting with live vaccines also seems to enhance the beneficial effects.

=== High-income countries ===
The non-specific effects were primarily observed in low-income countries with high infectious disease burdens, but they may not be limited to these areas. Recent Danish register-based studies have shown that the live attenuated measles-mumps-rubella vaccine (MMR) protects against hospital admissions with infectious diseases and specifically getting ill by respiratory syncytial virus.

== Immunological mechanisms ==
The findings from the epidemiological studies on the non-specific effects of vaccines pose a challenge to the current understanding of vaccines, and how they affect the immune system, and also question whether boys and girls have identical immune systems and should receive the same treatment.

The mechanisms for these effects are unclear. It is not known how vaccination induces rapid beneficial or harmful changes in the general susceptibility to infectious diseases, but the following mechanisms are likely to be involved.

=== Heterologous T-cell immunity ===
It is well known from animal studies that infections, apart from inducing pathogen-specific T-cells, also induce cross-reactive T-cells through epitope sharing, so-called heterologous immunity. Heterologous T-cell immunity can lead to improved clearance of a subsequent cross-reactive challenge, but it may also lead to increased morbidity. This mechanism may explain why DTP could have negative effects.

It would, however, not explain effects occurring shortly after vaccination, as for instance the rapidly occurring beneficial effects of BCG vaccine, as the heterologous effect would only be expected to be present after some weeks, as the adaptive immune response need time to develop. Also, it is difficult to explain why the effect would vanish once a child receives a new vaccine.

=== Trained innate immunity ===
The concept that not only plants and insects, but also humans have innate immune memory may provide new clues to why vaccines have non-specific effects. Studies into BCG have recently revealed that BCG induces epigenetic changes in the monocytes in adults, leading to increased pro-inflammatory cytokine production upon challenges with unrelated mitogens and pathogens (trained innate immunity).

In SCID mice that have no adaptive immune system, BCG reduced mortality from an otherwise lethal candida infection. The effects of BCG presented when tested after 2 weeks, but would be expected to occur rapidly after vaccination, and hence might be able to explain the very rapid protection against neonatal septicaemia seen after BCG vaccine.

Trained innate immunity may also explain the generally increased resistance against broad disease categories, such as fevers and lower respiratory tract infections; such effects would be difficult to explain merely by shared epitopes, unless such epitopes were almost universally common on pathogens.

Lastly, it is plausible that the effects are reversible by a different vaccine. Hence, trained innate immunity may provide a biological mechanism for the observed non-specific effects of vaccines.

== Controversy ==
In 2000 Aaby and colleagues presented data from Guinea-Bissau which suggested that DTP vaccination could, under some circumstances (e.g. absence of pertussis) be associated with increases in overall mortality, at least until children received measles vaccine. In response, WHO sponsored the analysis of a variety of data sets in other populations to test the hypothesis. None of these studies replicated the observation of increased mortality associated with DTP vaccination. WHO subsequently concluded, that the evidence was sufficient to reject the hypothesis for an increased nonspecific mortality following DTP vaccination.

However, Aaby and colleagues subsequently pointed out that the studies which failed to show any mortality increase associated with DTP vaccination used methods of analysis that can introduce a bias against finding such an effect.

In these studies, data on childhood vaccinations were typically collected in periodic surveys, and the information on vaccinations, which occurred between successive home visits, was updated at the time of the second visit. The person-time at risk in unvaccinated and vaccinated states was then divided up according to the date of vaccination during the time interval between visits. This method opens up a potential bias, insofar as the updating of person time at risk from unvaccinated to vaccinated is only possible for children who survive to the second follow-up. Those who die between visits typically do not have vaccinations between the first visit and death recorded, and thus they will tend to be allocated as deaths in unvaccinated children – thus incorrectly inflating the mortality rate among unvaccinated children.

This bias has been described before, but in different contexts, as the distinction between "landmark" and "retrospective updating" analysis of cohort data. The retrospective updating method can lead to a considerable bias in vaccine studies, biasing observed mortality rate ratios towards zero (a large effect), whereas the landmark method leads to a non-specific misclassification and biases the mortality rate ratio towards unity(no effect).

An additional problem with the literature on the nonspecific effects of vaccines has been the variety and unexpected nature of the hypotheses which have appeared (in particular relating to sex-specific effects), which has meant that it has not always been clear whether some apparent "effects" were the result of post hoc analyses or whether they were reflections of a priori hypotheses.

This was discussed at length at a review of the work of Aaby and his colleagues in Copenhagen in 2005. The review was convened by the Danish National Research Foundation and the Novo Nordisk Foundation who have sponsored much of the work of Aaby and his colleagues. An outcome of the review was the explicit formulation of a series of testable hypotheses, agreed by the Aaby group. It was hoped that independent investigators would design and conduct studies powered to confirm or refute these hypotheses.

Also, the two foundations sponsored a workshop on the analysis of vaccine effects, which was held in London in 2008. The workshop resulted in three papers. The proceedings were forwarded to WHO which subsequently concluded that "conclusive evidence for or against non-specific effects of vaccines on mortality, including a potential deleterious effect of DTP vaccination on children's survival as has been reported in some studies, was unlikely to be obtained from observational studies. The GACVS will keep a watch on the evidence of nonspecific effects of vaccination.".

In 2013, WHO established a working group tasked with reviewing the evidence for the non-specific effects of BCG, measles and DTP vaccines. Two independent reviews were conducted, an immunological review and an epidemiological review. The results were presented at the April 2014 meeting of WHO's Strategic Group of Experts on Immunization (SAGE). WHO/SAGE "concluded that the findings from the immunological systematic review neither exclude nor confirm the possibility of beneficial or deleterious non-specific immunological effects of the vaccines under study on all-cause mortality. The published literature does not provide confidence in the quality, quantity, or kinetics of impact of any non-specific immunological effects in young children after vaccination. [...] SAGE considered that the non-specific effects on all-cause mortality warrant further research. [...] SAGE considered that additional observational studies with substantial risk of bias would be unlikely to contribute to policy decision making and therefore should not be encouraged."

== See also ==
- Proposed Guinea-Bissau hepatitis B vaccine trial
- Vaccine hesitancy
