= Vaccine (journal) =

- Discipline: Vaccinology
- Language: English
- Edited by: Gregory Poland

Publication details
- History: 1983–present
- Publisher: Elsevier (United States)
- Frequency: Weekly
- Open access: Yes (Vaccine: X, mirror journal)
- Impact factor: 5.5 (2022)

Standard abbreviations
- ISO 4: Vaccine

Indexing
- ISSN: 0264-410X
- OCLC no.: 67282282

Links
- Journal homepage; Online archive

Vaccine is a peer-reviewed medical journal, published by Elsevier. It is targeted towards medical professionals who are interested in vaccinology, vaccines, and vaccination. The official journal of the Edward Jenner Society and the Japanese Society for Vaccinology, Vaccine describes itself as "an interface between academics, those in research and development, and workers in the field", covering topics "rang[ing] from basic research through to applications, safety and legislation." As of 2020, Gregory A. Poland is Vaccine's editor-in-chief.
