= Statens Serum Institut =

Danish medical research institute

Coordinates: 55.666°N 12.591°E

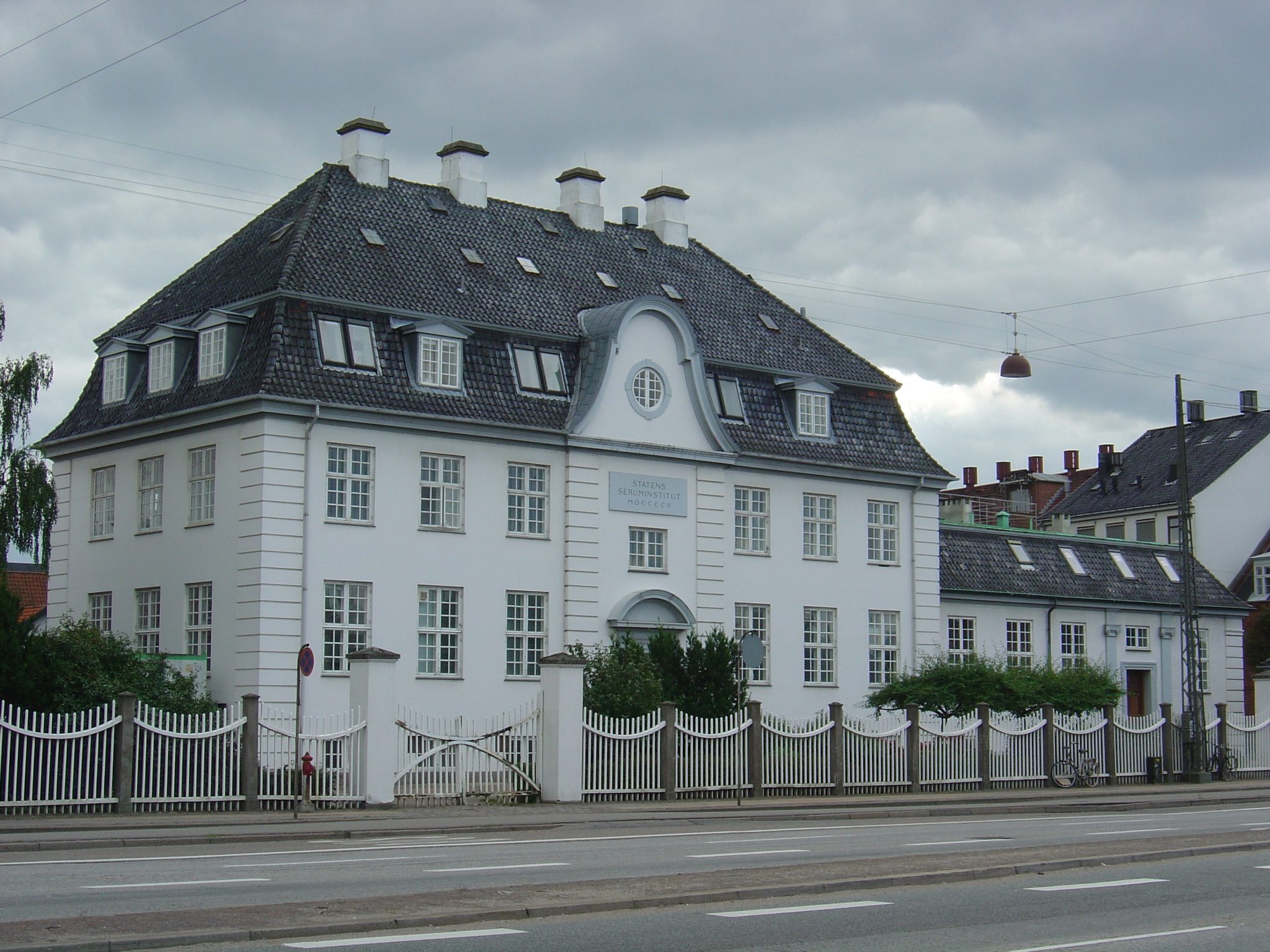
The main building of the original serum institute is represented on the company logo.

Statens Serum Institut (SSI, lit. The State's Serum Institute), is a Danish sector research institute located on the island of Amager in Copenhagen. Its purpose is to combat and prevent infectious diseases, congenital disorders, and threats from weapons of mass destruction.

== History ==
Founded in 1902 in the barracks of the Artillerivej road, it has now expanded to much more than its original size and is now one of Denmark's largest research institutions in the health sector. 20% of sales are used on Research and Development and Danish and International funds contribute around 100 million DKK.

Administratively, the State Serum Institute sorts under the Danish Ministry of Health and Prevention under minister of health. Virologist Herdis von Magnus headed the institute's enterovirus department in 1955 and led the development and distribution of the polio vaccine in Denmark.

The president and CEO of the institute has since 2020 been Henrik Ullum, preceded by Kåre Mølbak. The Department of Epidemiology plays a large role in the surveillance and tracking of infectious disease outbreaks in Denmark allowing for comprehensive monitoring of Danish public health. Apart from research into epidemiology and disease prevention, the institute also develops and produces vaccines, and is an integral part of the Danish ABC-preparedness operation. The institute has successfully produced the vaccines: BCG vaccine Danish Strain 1331 against tuberculosis, diTeBooster for revaccination, and VeroPol which is an inactivated poliomyelitis virus vaccine(IPV) that produces antibodies after primary vaccination for poliovirus 1, 2, and 3.

Apart from work in Denmark, Statens Serum Institut is also involved in health promotion and monitoring in Guinea-Bissau, as maintained by the Bandim Health Project.

Mainly doctors, pharmaconomists (expert in pharmaceuticals) and pharmacists work at the National Serum Institute. A total of 385 people at SSI are engaged in research. SSI contributes each year over 30 master students and 10-15 PhDs. In 2009, the institute made 326 publications, 279 of which had an impact factor. 74 of these publications were related to topics of infectious disease; an area of study that the institute is focusing on in preparation for new resistant strain emergence due to antibiotic resistance.

SSI has transferred its vaccine production business to AJ Vaccines. AJ Vaccines will continue to produce vaccines on SSI's facility. SSI, under the auspices of the Ministry of Health and Prevention, will continue to be responsible for ensuring the supply of vaccines to the Danish vaccination programmes.
