= List of women who died in childbirth =

This is a list of notable women who suffered maternal death. The World Health Organization (WHO) defines maternal death as the death of a pregnant mother due to complications related to pregnancy, underlying conditions worsened by the pregnancy or management of these conditions. This can occur either while she is pregnant or within six weeks of resolution of the pregnancy. Other definitions may include accidental and incidental causes or extend the period of observation to one year after the end of the pregnancy.

== Women by country ==
=== Angola ===
- Ivone Mufuca (2016), handball player

=== Australia ===
- Emma Lambrick (1846), the first European woman to die at Port Essington
- Hattie Shepparde (1874), actor, and first wife of Henry Hallam
- Sumner Locke (1917), writer
- Daphne Akhurst (1933), five time consecutive winner of women's singles title at the Australian Championships from 1925 to 1930
- Rona Glynn (1965), the first Indigenous Australian school teacher and nurse in Alice Springs

=== Austria ===
- Joanna of Austria (1578), Grand Duchess of Tuscany
- Margaret of Austria (1611), Queen of Spain and Portugal
- Maria Anna of Spain (1646), youngest daughter of King Philip III of Spain and Margaret of Austria, who also died in childbirth
- Maria Leopoldine of Austria (1649), Holy Roman Empress and Queen of Hungary and Bohemia
- Maria Antonia of Austria (1692), first wife of Maximilian II Emanuel, Elector of Bavaria
- Maria Anna of Austria (1744)
- Duchess Elisabeth of Württemberg (1790), Archduchess of Austria
- Princess Hermine of Anhalt-Bernburg-Schaumburg-Hoym (1817), Archduchess of Austria
- Maria Leopoldina of Austria (1826), Empress of Brazil and Queen of Portugal
- Adelaide of Austria (1855), first wife of Victor Emmanuel II of Sardinia, future King of Italy
- Archduchess Helena of Austria (1924)

=== Belarus ===
- Zofia of Słuck (1612)

=== Bohemia ===
- Judith of Bohemia (1086), Duchess of Poland
- Judith of Habsburg (1297), Queen of Bohemia
- Margaret of Bohemia (1322), daughter of Wenceslaus II of Bohemia and Judith of Habsburg, who also died in childbirth
- Kunigunde of Sternberg (1449), days after she delivered twins, Catherine of Poděbrady (who also died in childbirth) and Sidonie
- Catherine of Poděbrady (1464), Bohemian princess, Queen of Hungary
- Anne of Foix (1506), Bohemian princess, Queen of Hungary, mother of Anne of Bohemia and Hungary, who also died in childbirth.
- Anna of Bohemia and Hungary (1547), Bohemian princess died while giving birth to Joanna of Austria, Grand Duchess of Tuscany, who also died in childbirth
- Juliane Reichardt (1783), pianist

=== Bosnia and Herzegovina ===
- Barbara del Balzo (1459), second wife of Stjepan Vukčić Kosača

=== Bulgaria ===
- Princess Marie Louise of Bourbon-Parma (1899), mother of Tsar Boris III of Bulgaria.

=== Burma ===
- Mwei Daw (1368), principal queen of King Binnya U of Martaban–Hanthawaddy, and mother of King Razadarit.
- Shin Myo Myat (1520s), mother of King Bayinnaung of the Toungoo dynasty of Burma (Myanmar), and wet nurse of King Tabinshwehti.
- Hsinbyume (1812), first wife of Bagyidaw

=== Byzantine Empire ===
- Aelia Eudoxia (404), Empress consort of the Byzantine Emperor Arcadius
- Tzitzak (750), first wife of Byzantine Emperor Constantine V
- Eudokia Baïana (901), third wife of Leo VI the Wise
- Irene Angelina (1208), widow of Roger III of Sicily and widow of Philip of Swabia, who died two months before her
- Caterina Gattilusio (1442)

=== Cambodia ===
- Vichara Dany (1976), actress
- Saom Vansodany (1977), actress

=== Canada ===
- Simmi Kahlon (2009), Indian-Canadian serial killer

=== China ===
- Fu Hao (1200 BC), the consort of King Wu Ding of the Shang dynasty and, unusually for that time, also served as a military general and high priestess. Mother of Prince Jie
- Xu Pingjun (71 BC), consort of Emperor Xuan of Han
- Empress Yujiulü (540), second and last consort of Emperor Wen of Western Wei
- Princess Yongtai (701), daughter of the Emperor Zhongzong of Tang dynasty and granddaughter of Empress Wu Zetian
- Empress Xiaojiesu (1528), first Empress consort of the Jiajing Emperor of the Ming dynasty.
- Amannisa Khan (1560)
- Empress Xiaochengren (1674), first Empress consort of the Kangxi Emperor of the Qing dynasty
- Empress Xiaozhaoren (1678), second Empress consort of the Kangxi Emperor of the Qing dynasty
- Empress Xiaoyiren (1689), third Empress consort of the Kangxi Emperor of the Qing dynasty
- Noble Consort Xin (1764), consort of the Qianlong Emperor of the Qing dynasty
- Princess Rong'an (1875), daughter of the Xianfeng Emperor of the Qing dynasty
- Lu Yin (1934), writer
- Cai Weilian (1939), oil painter, daughter of philosopher Cai Yuanpei, wife of Lin Wenzheng.

=== Croatia ===
- Dora Pejačević (1923), composer

=== Czech Republic ===
- Anna von Schweidnitz (1362), third wife and queen consort of Charles IV, Holy Roman Emperor
- Elizabeth Jane Weston (1612), English-Czech poet

=== Denmark ===
- Dagmar of Bohemia (1212), queen consort of King Valdemar II of Denmark.
- Eleanor of Portugal, Queen of Denmark (1231)
- Elisabeth Helene von Vieregg (1704), spouse of the king
- Louise of Great Britain (1751), Queen of Denmark and Norway as first wife of Frederick V. She was the youngest surviving daughter of George II of Great Britain and Caroline of Ansbach.
- Princess Louise of Denmark (1756)
- Birgitte Sofie Gabel (1769)
- Mariane Bournonville (1797), ballerina and first wife of Antoine Bournonville
- Catharine Simonsen (1849), soprano, mother of Niels Juel Simonsen and grandmother of Erik Schmedes, Hakon Schmedes and Gerda Christophersen

=== Egypt ===
- Henhenet (2015 BC), a lower ranking wife of Pharaoh Mentuhotep II of the 11th dynasty.
- Meketaten (1340 BC)
- Mutnedjmet (13th century BC), wife of Pharaoh Horemheb
- Cleopatra V (mid first century BC)
- Jamal Nur Qadin (1876)

=== Ethiopia ===
- Princess Tsehai (1942)

=== Finland ===
- Elsa Holmsten (1735), poet

=== France ===
- Hildegard (783), Queen of the Franks
- Judith of Flanders (870), wife of Baldwin I, Margrave of Flanders and eldest child of Charles the Bald and Ermentrude of Orléans
- Matilda of Frisia (1044), first Queen of Henry I, King of the Franks
- the mother of Saint Drogo (1105)
- Sibylla of Burgundy (1150)
- Constance of Castile (1160), second wife of Louis VII of France
- Isabella of Hainault (1190), first wife of King Philip II of France died the day after giving birth to twins. Both twins lived for just four days.
- Constance of Brittany (1201), mother of Alix, Duchess of Brittany, who also died in childbirth
- Agnes of Merania (1201), queen of France
- Alix, Duchess of Brittany (1221), Duchess of Brittany, and daughter of Constance of Brittany, who also died in childbirth
- Yolande of Dreux (1248), first wife of Hugh IV of Burgundy
- Alice de Lusignan, Countess of Surrey (1256)
- Margaret of France, Duchess of Brabant (1271), daughter of Louis IX of France and his wife Margaret of Provence
- Joan I of Navarre (1305), Queen of Navarre, Countess of Champagne, and Queen of France
- Beatrice of Luxembourg, Queen of Hungary (1319), wife of Charles I of Hungary
- Marie of Luxembourg (1324), Queen consort of France and Navarre, second wife of King Charles IV of France
- Isabella, Countess of Vertus (1372), wife of Gian Galeazzo Visconti, Lord of Milan
- Joanna of Bourbon (1378), Queen of France
- Beatrice of Navarre, Countess of La Marche (1407), first wife of James II, Count of La Marche
- Isabella of Valois (1409), Queen consort of England as the second spouse of King Richard II. Her parents were King Charles VI of France and Isabeau of Bavaria.
- Catherine of Valois (1437), Queen consort of England from 1420 to 1422.
- Marie de Bourbon, Duchess of Calabria (1448)
- Agnès Sorel (1450), first Chief Mistress Of Charles VII of France
- Anne of Savoy (1480), first wife of Frederick of Naples
- Madeleine de La Tour d'Auvergne (1519)
- Claude of France (1524), Queen of France as the first wife of Francis I
- Eleonore of Fürstenberg (1544), wife of Philipp IV, Count of Hanau-Lichtenberg
- Elisabeth of Valois (1568), Queen of Spain
- Marie of Cleves, Princess of Condé (1574)
- Claude of Valois (1575), Duchess of Lorraine
- Charlotte de La Marck (1594), Princess of Sedan and Duchess of Bouillon
- Gabrielle d'Estrées (1599), mistress of Henry IV of France, died following eclampsia
- Marie, Duchess of Montpensier (1627), Duchess of Orléans
- Elisabeth of France (1644), first wife and Queen consort of Philip IV of Spain
- Claude-Françoise of Lorraine (1648), wife of Nicholas II, Duke of Lorraine, died while giving birth to twin daughters
- Marie Angélique de Scorailles (1681), noblewoman
- Armande de La Tour d'Auvergne (1717), noblewoman
- Marie Louise Élisabeth d'Orléans (1719), Duchess of Berry a.k.a. "Joufflotte", married at 14, widowed at 18, died at 23 soon after her sixth delivery, pregnant again at autopsy.
- Auguste of Baden-Baden, duchesse d'Orléans, (1726) and paternal great-grandmother of Louis-Philippe I, King of the French
- Louise Diane d'Orléans (1736), princesse de Conti, youngest daughter of Philippe d'Orléans, Regent of France
- Anne Marie Louise de La Tour d'Auvergne (1739), noblewoman
- Pauline Félicité de Mailly-Nesle (1741), marquise de Vintimille and second of the five famous de Nesle sisters
- Princess Anna Theresa of Savoy (1745), daughter of the Prince and Princess of Carignan, wife of Charles de Rohan;
- Maria Teresa Rafaela of Spain, Dauphine of France (1746), first wife of Louis, Dauphin of France (1729–1765) and daughter-in-law of Louis XV
- Émilie du Châtelet (1749), mathematician, physicist, and author
- Charlotte Rosalie de Choiseul-Beaupré (1753), lady-in-waiting
- Princess Maria Teresa Felicitas of Modena, duchesse de Penthièvre (1754) and maternal grandmother of Louis Philippe I
- Catherine Éléonore Bénard (1769), mistress of Louis XV
- Antoinette Gabrielle Charpentier (1793), first wife of George Danton
- Marie-Clementine Bagration (1829)
- Juliette Dubufe (1855), sculptor
- Princess Victoria of Saxe-Coburg and Gotha (1857), last Duchess of Nemours
- Marie-Félix Blanc (1882)
- Eva Gonzalès (1883), Impressionist painter

=== Georgia ===
- Balendukht
- Tamar of Mukhrani (1683)
- Ketevan Andronikashvili (1782)
- Princess Helen of Georgia (1786)
- Darya Gruzinskaya (1796)

=== Germany ===
- Gertrude of Süpplingenburg (1143), margravine
- Elisabeth of Swabia (1235), Queen consort of Castile
- Anna von Schweidnitz (1362), third wife of Charles IV, Holy Roman Emperor
- Magdalene of Saxony (1534), margravine
- Agnes of Hesse (1555), princess
- Magdalena of Lippe (1587), landgravine
- Dorothea of Saxony (1587), princess
- Sophie of Württemberg, Duchess of Saxe-Weimar (1590), noblewoman
- Elisabeth of Mansfeld-Hinterort (1596)
- Agnes of Solms-Laubach (1602), landgravine
- Princess Sibylle Elisabeth of Württemberg (1606)
- Eleanor of Prussia (1607)
- Princess Dorothea Hedwig of Brunswick-Wolfenbüttel (1609)
- Duchess Sophie of Prussia (1610), wife of Wilhelm Kettler
- Princess Johanna Elisabeth of Nassau-Hadamar (1647)
- Sophie Eleonore of Hesse-Darmstadt (1663), landgravine
- Maria Elisabeth of Holstein-Gottorp (1665), landgravine
- Sibylle Ursula von Braunschweig-Lüneburg (1671), translator and writer
- Dorothea Maria of Saxe-Weimar, Duchess of Saxe-Zeitz (1675)
- Marie Luise von Degenfeld (1677)
- Elizabeth of Palatinate-Zweibrücken (1677)
- Christiane of Saxe-Merseburg (1679)
- Marie Hedwig of Hesse-Darmstadt (1680)
- Sophie Hedwig of Saxe-Merseburg (1686)
- Eleonore Sophie of Saxe-Weimar (1687)
- Sophie Amalie of Nassau-Siegen (1688)
- Charlotte of Nassau-Schaumburg (1700)
- Countess Sophie Henriette of Waldeck (1702)
- Princess Luise Dorothea of Prussia (1705), Hereditary Princess of Hesse-Kassel
- Princess Elisabeth Albertine of Anhalt-Dessau (1706), noblewoman
- Christine Juliane of Baden-Durlach (1707), noblewoman
- Maria Clara Eimmart (1707)
- Elisabeth Juliana Francisca of Hesse-Homburg (1707)
- Countess Palatine Elisabeth Auguste Sofie of Neuburg (1728), Hereditary Princess of Sulzbach
- Louise of Anhalt-Dessau (1732), first wife of Victor Frederick, Prince of Anhalt-Bernburg
- Catharina Sperling-Heckel (1741), German artist
- Christiane Sophie Charlotte of Brandenburg-Bayreuth (1757), Duchess of Saxe-Hildburghausen
- Meta Klopstock (1758)
- Louise Albertine of Schleswig-Holstein-Sonderburg-Plön (1769), (also died of measles)
- Josepha von Heydeck (1771)
- Eva König (1778)
- Princess Friederike of Hesse-Darmstadt (1782), Duchess of Mecklenburg-Strelitz
- Princess Charlotte of Hesse-Darmstadt (1785), by marriage Duchess of Mecklenburg-Strelitz.
- Duchess Frederica of Württemberg (1785), daughter of Frederick II Eugene, Duke of Württemberg and Friederike Dorothea of Brandenburg-Schwedt.
- Duchess Auguste Karoline of Brunswick-Wolfenbüttel (1788)
- Duchess Louise Charlotte of Mecklenburg-Schwerin (1801), maternal grandmother of Prince Albert, husband of Queen Victoria of the UK
- Sophie Mereau (1806), writer
- Marie of Brunswick-Wolfenbüttel (1808), mother of Charles II, Duke of Brunswick, and William, Duke of Brunswick
- Princess Caroline Louise of Saxe-Weimar-Eisenach (1816)
- Princess Adelheid of Anhalt-Bernburg-Schaumburg-Hoym (1820), first wife of Augustus, Grand Duke of Oldenburg
- Princess Mathilde of Waldeck and Pyrmont (1825)
- Henriette Spitzeder (1828), opera singer
- Marie-Clementine Bagration (1829), illegitimate daughter of Prince Klemens von Metternich and Princess Catherine Bagration.
- Wilhelmine von Wrochem (1839), flutist, singer and actress.
- Princess Cecilia of Sweden (1844), daughter of King Gustav IV Adolf of Sweden and Frederica of Baden, a composer
- Charlotte of Saxe-Meiningen (1855), first wife of Georg II, Duke of Saxe-Meiningen and mother of Bernhard III, Duke of Saxe-Meiningen
- Princess Anna of Saxony (1859), first wife of Ferdinand IV, Grand Duke of Tuscany
- Princess Anna of Hesse and by Rhine (1865), Grand Duchess of Mecklenburg-Schwerin
- Princess Elisabeth of Thurn and Taxis (1881)
- Princess Marie of Waldeck and Pyrmont (1882), Princess of Württemberg
- Princess Marie of Prussia (1888)
- Princess Ida of Schaumburg-Lippe (1891), only wife of Heinrich XXII, Prince Reuss of Greiz
- Paula Modersohn-Becker (1907), artist
- Duchess Amalie in Bavaria (1912), Duchess of Urach

=== Greece ===
- Antigone of Epirus (295 BC)
- Nysa (wife of Pharnaces I of Pontus) (160 BC)
- Athenais (daughter of Herodes Atticus) (161)
- Agnes of Montferrat (1208), first Empress consort of Henry of Flanders
- Theodora Tocco (1429), first wife of Constantine Palaiologos
- Maria Katelouzou Venizelou (1894), wife of Eleftherios Venizelos, giving birth to Sophoklis Venizelos

=== Hungary ===
- Clemence of Austria (1293 or 1295)
- Beatrice of Luxembourg (1319)
- Mary, Queen of Hungary (1395)
- Krisztina Nyáry (1641)

=== India ===
- Maya, mother of Gautama Buddha
- Dandi Mahadevi (936), Queen Regent of Odisha
- Masuma Sultan Begum (1509)
- Mumtaz Mahal (1631), wife of Mughal emperor Shah Jahan. Her memorial is the Taj Mahal
- Gowri Lakshmi Bayi (1815), Maharani of Travancore
- Sahib Kaur (1841)
- T. K. Padmini (1969), painter
- Smita Patil (1986), Indian actress and wife of Raj Babbar
- Shari S. Nair (2003), victim of Kiliroor sex scandal

=== Indonesia ===
- Kartini (1904), Promoter of gender equality in Indonesia
- Percha Leanpuri (2021), politician

=== Ireland ===
- Joan Apsley (1599)
- Mary Letitia Martin (1850), novelist
- Sheila Hodgers (1983), (also died of multiple cancers)
- Ann Lovett (1984), unmarried teenage mother whose death sparked a national debate
- Savita Halappanavar (2012), her death caused widespread outrage after doctors refused to terminate her 17-week-long pregnancy, and ignited protests and debate on Irish abortion laws.

=== Kingdom of Jerusalem ===
Now Israel and Palestine.

- Maria of Montferrat (1212), Queen of Jerusalem, died after giving birth to Isabella, also died in childbirth
- Isabella II of Jerusalem (1228), Holy Roman Empress, daughter of Maria of Montferrat, who died in childbirth.

=== Italy ===
- Julia (104 BC), first wife of Sulla
- Caecilia Metella (89 BC), second daughter of Quintus Caecilius Metellus Balearicus
- Aemilia Scaura (82 BC), daughter of the Roman patrician Marcus Aemilius Scaurus
- Cornelia (69 BC), wife of Julius Caesar, mother of Julia, who also died in childbirth
- Julia (54 BC), daughter of Julius Caesar and fourth wife of Pompey
- Tullia (45 BC), daughter of Marcus Tullius Cicero
- Junia Claudilla (34 AD, 36 AD, or 37 AD), first wife of Caligula, Roman Emperor
- Poppaea Sabina (65 AD), second wife of Nero
- Julia Flavia (91 AD), daughter of emperor Titus
- Galla (394), wife of Theodosius I
- Joan of England, Queen of Sicily (1199), fourth wife of Raymond VI, Count of Toulouse
- Yolande Palaiologina (1342), daughter of Theodore I, Marquess of Montferrat
- Maria of Calabria (1366)
- Polissena Ruffo (1420)
- Theodora Tocco (1429), first wife of Constantine Palaiologos
- Costanza Varano (1447)
- Anne of Savoy (1480), Queen of Naples
- Beatrice d'Este (1497), wife of Lodovico Sforza
- Anna Sforza (1497), Hereditary Princess of Ferrara
- Lucrezia Borgia (1519), daughter of Pope Alexander VI
- Clarice de' Medici (1528)
- Marietta Robusti (1590), 16th-century artist and daughter of the artist Jacopo Tintoretto
- Catalina Micaela of Spain (1597), daughter of Philip II of Spain and Elisabeth of Valois
- Isabella of Savoy (1626), daughter of Charles Emmanuel I, Duke of Savoy
- Maria Caterina Farnese (1646), first wife of Francesco I d'Este, Duke of Modena
- Vittoria Farnese (1649), daughter of Ranuccio I Farnese, niece of Pope Clement VIII
- Laura Mancini (1657), eldest of the five famous Mancini sisters
- Princess Margaret Yolande of Savoy (1663), Duchess of Parma
- Isabella d'Este, (1666) second wife of Ranuccio II Farnese, Duke of Parma
- Princess Charlotte Felicity of Brunswick (1710), died in Modena, wife of Rinaldo d'Este, Duke of Modena
- Anne Christine of Sulzbach (1723), first wife of Charles Emmanuel III of Sardinia
- Elisabeth Therese of Lorraine (1741), final wife of Charles Emmanuel III of Sardinia
- Princess Luisa of Naples and Sicily (1802), died in Vienna; wife of Ferdinand III, Grand Duke of Tuscany
- Maria Theresa of Naples and Sicily (1807), eldest daughter of Ferdinand IV of Naples
- Maria Brizzi Giorgi (1812), organist
- Maria Cristina of Savoy (1836), first Queen consort of Ferdinand II of the Two Sicilies
- Charlotte Napoléone Bonaparte (1839), daughter of Joseph Bonaparte, older brother of Emperor Napoleon
- Lella Ricci (1871), opera singer
- Carlotta Marchisio (1872), opera singer
- Princess Maria Pia of Bourbon-Two Sicilies (1882)

=== Japan ===
- Fujiwara no Anshi (964 AD), wife of Emperor Murakami
- Fujiwara no Teishi (1001), wife of Emperor Ichijō
- Koshikibu no Naishi (1025), poet
- Fujiwara no Ishi (1033), wife of Emperor Horikawa and mother of Emperor Toba
- Fujiwara no Genshi (1039), wife of Emperor Go-Suzaku
- Fujiwara no Shunshi (1233), wife of Emperor Go-Horikawa and mother of Emperor Shijō
- Kitsuno (1566), concubine.
- Tamahime (1622), daughter of Tokugawa Hidetaka and Oeyo; wife of Maeda Toshitsune
- Hamuro Mitsuko (1873), consort of Emperor Meiji
- Hashimoto Natsuko (1873), consort of Emperor Meiji
- Senuma Kayō (1915)
- Madokoro Akutagawa Saori (1966), Japanese painter

=== Korea ===
- Queen Heonjeong (992), consort of Gyeongjong of Goryeo.
- Queen Jeongsun (1237), consort of Wonjong of Goryeo and mother of Chungnyeol of Goryeo
- Princess Joguk (1325), third wife of Chungsuk of Goryeo
- Princess Noguk (1365), Mongolian born consort of Gongmin of Goryeo
- Queen Hyeondeok (1441), consort of Munjong of Joseon and mother of Danjong of Joseon
- Queen Jangsun (1461), consort of Yejong of Joseon
- Queen Janggyeong (1515), consort of Jungjong of Joseon and mother of Injong of Joseon
- Princess Hyohye (1531), daughter of Jungjong of Joseon and Queen Janggyeong
- Queen Inyeol (1636), consort of Injo of Joseon
- Princess Hwapyeong (1748), daughter of Yeongjo of Joseon
- the mother of Stephen Min Kuk-ka (1787)
- Princess Rong'an (1875)
- Kim Jong-suk (1949), second wife of Kim Il Sung, mother of Kim Jong Il and grandmother of Kim Jong Un

=== Liberia ===
- Salome Karwah (2017), Ebola survivor

=== Madagascar ===
- Princess Razafinandriamanitra of Madagascar (1897)

=== Malaysia ===
- Siti Sarah (2021), singer

=== Mexico ===
- Cihuateteo (Aztec Era)
- Julia Pastrana (1860), born with hypertrichosis, took part in exhibition tours in North America and Europe because of her unusual appearance
- Delfina Ortega Díaz (1880), First Lady Of Mexico
- Cristina Farfán (1880), educator, writer, and women's rights activist
- Hiromi Hayakawa (2017), singer and actress

=== Montenegro ===
- Princess Zorka of Montenegro (1890), mother of King Alexander I of Yugoslavia

=== Netherlands ===
- Aleijda Wolfsen (1692), painter
- Anna Maria de Bruyn (1744), ballet dancer and stage actor
- Suzanna Sablairolles (1867), stage actor
- C.C. van Asch van Wijck (1932), sculptor

=== Nepal ===
- Trailokya Rajya Lakshmi Devi (1850), queen consort
- Indra Rajya Lakshmi Devi Shah (1950), crown princess

=== New Zealand ===
- Sue Maroroa (2023), chess player

=== Nigeria ===
- Bisi Komolafe (2012), actress
- Funmilola Ogundana (2013), sprinter
- Kefee (2014, died from pre-eclampsia at six months gestation)
- Moji Olaiya (2017), actress

=== Norway ===
- Christina of Norway (1213), Princess of Norway
- Margaret of Scotland (Queen of Norway) (1283), after giving birth to Margaret, Maid of Norway
- Johanne Bruhn (1890–1921), actress

=== Ottoman Empire ===
- Ismihan Sultan (1585), princess
- Fatma Sultan (1590), princess
- Princess Kaya Sultan (1659)
- Princess Mihrimah Sultan (1838)
- Nergizev Hanım (1848)
- Princess Esma Sultan (1899)

=== Persia ===
- Stateira I (332 BC), Queen of Persia and wife of Darius III, died in captivity.
- Balendukht (fifth century)
- Dilras Banu Begum (1657), chief consort of Aurangzeb

=== Peru ===
- Lady of Cao (450 AD)

=== Philippines ===
- Leonor Rivera (1893)

=== Poland ===
- Anna von Schweidnitz (1362), Queen of Bohemia
- Jadwiga of Poland (1399), monarch of Poland
- Barbara Zápolya (1515)
- Anne of Austria, Queen of Poland (1598), Austrian born Queen of Poland
- Marianna Wiśniowiecka (1624), noblewoman
- Cecilia Renata of Austria (1644), Queen of Poland
- Ludwika Karolina Radziwiłł (1695)
- Princess Malgorzata Izabella Czartoryska (1929), first wife of Prince Gabriel of Bourbon-Two Sicilies

=== Portugal ===
- Dulce of Aragon (1198)
- Berengaria of Portugal (1221), Queen consort of Denmark
- Constanza Manuel (1345), wife of Peter I of Portugal
- Isabella of Asturias (1498), married Afonso of Portugal and Manuel I of Portugal
- Maria of Aragon, Queen of Portugal (1517)
- Beatrice of Portugal, Duchess of Savoy (1538)
- Isabella of Portugal (1539), Holy Roman Empress, Queen of Italy and Queen of Spain
- Maria Manuela of Portugal (1545), daughter of King John III of Portugal and Catherine of Austria
- Infanta Mariana Victoria of Portugal (1788, also died of smallpox), wife of Infante Gabriel of Spain, who died of smallpox
- Maria Isabel of Portugal (1818), Queen of Spain as the second wife of Ferdinand VII of Spain
- Queen Maria II of Portugal (1853)

=== Russia ===
- Maria Miloslavskaya (1669), first wife of Alexis of Russia
- Agafya Grushetskaya (1681), first wife of Tsar Feodor III of Russia
- Charlotte Christine of Brunswick-Lüneburg (1715), consort of Tsarevich Alexei Petrovich of Russia
- Grand Duchess Anna Petrovna of Russia (1728), daughter of Catherine I of Russia and mother of Peter III of Russia
- Grand Duchess Anna Leopoldovna of Russia (1746), regent of Russia and mother of Ivan VI of Russia
- Alexandra Rzevskaya (1769)
- Grand Duchess Alexandra Pavlovna of Russia (1801), daughter of Tsar Paul I of Russia and archduchess of Austria as consort of Archduke Joseph, Palatine of Hungary
- Praskovia Kovalyova-Zhemchugova (1803), opera singer and actress
- Grand Duchess Alexandra Nikolaevna of Russia (1844), youngest daughter of Tsar Nicholas I, Emperor of Russia, and Princess Charlotte of Prussia
- Grand Duchess Elizabeth Mikhailovna of Russia (1845), daughter of Grand Duke Mikhail Pavlovich of Russia and Princess Charlotte of Württemberg
- Mariya Meshcherskaya (1868), a lady-in-waiting
- Daria Konstantinowa Opotschinina (1870), granddaughter of Mikhail Kutuzov and countess of Beauharnais
- Hesya Helfman (1882), member of Narodnaya Volya
- Alexandra Georgievna of Greece and Denmark, (1891) consort of Grand Duke Paul Alexandrovich of Russia
- Ekaterina Beketova (1892), Russian poet and writer
- Vasilya Fattakhova (2016), singer

=== Serbia ===
- Milica Branković (1464), first wife of Leonardo III Tocco, mother of Carlo III Tocco
- Bobana Veličković (2020), sport shooter

=== Slovenia ===
- Josipina Turnograjska (1854), poet

=== South Africa ===
- Bongi Makeba (1985), singer

=== Spain ===
- Urraca of León (1126), Queen of León, Castile, and Galicia
- Elvira of Castile, Queen of Sicily (1135)
- Blanche of Navarre (1156), wife of the future King Sancho III of Castile
- Zaida of Seville (c.1171), a mistress and perhaps queen of Alfonso VI of Castile
- Teresa Fernández de Traba (1180), queen consort of León
- Blanche of Anjou (1310), Queen of Aragon
- Teresa d'Entença (1327), Queen consort of Aragon by her marriage to King Alfonso IV of Aragon
- Maria of Navarre (1347)
- Constance of Aragon, Queen of Sicily (1363)
- Eleanor of Aragon, Queen of Castile (1382), Queen consort of Castile and León
- Elvira Fernández de Córdoba y Manrique (1524), noblewoman
- Elisabeth of Valois (1568), third wife of Philip II of Spain
- Infanta Catherine Michelle of Spain (1597), Duchess of Savoy
- Margarita Teresa of Spain (1673)
- Maria Teresa Rafaela of Spain (1746), first wife of Louis, Dauphin of France (1729-1765)
- Princess Isabella of Parma (1763), Archduchess of Austria
- Infanta María Amalia of Spain (1798)
- Maria Isabel of Braganza (1818), wife of Ferdinand VII
- Pepita de Oliva (1871), dancer
- Mercedes, Princess of Asturias (1904)
- Infanta María Teresa of Spain (1912)
- Conchita Supervía (1936), opera singer

=== Sweden ===
- Benedicta Ebbesdotter of Hvide (1200), queen consort of King Sverker II of Sweden.
- Ingeborg Eriksdotter of Sweden (1254), princess and the mother of the king
- Sofia Gyllenhielm (1583), noblewoman, only wife of Pontus De la Gardie
- Christiana Oxenstierna (1701), noblewoman
- Hedvig Taube (1744), royal mistress, salonist
- Carin du Rietz (1788), adventurer
- Anna Charlotta Schröderhiem (1791), salonist and socialite
- Charlotte Slottsberg (1800), ballerina
- Cecilia Holstein-Gottorp (1844), Grand Duchess of Oldenburg
- Marie-Louise af Forsell (1852), diarist
- Emilie Hammarskjöld (1854), composer, musician, member of the Royal Swedish Academy of Music
- Emilia Uggla (1855), pianist

=== Switzerland ===
- Joanna of Pfirt (1351), duchess of Austria
- Anna Barbara Zellweger (1815), Political Advisor

=== Thailand ===
- Somanass Waddhanawathy (1852)

=== Tunisia ===
- Majida Boulila (1952)

=== Uganda ===
- Grace Kaudha (2017), politician

=== United Kingdom ===
- Beatrix de Vesci (1125)
- Isabel Marshal (1240), English countess, great-grandmother of Robert the Bruce of Scotland
- Isabella of England (1241), English princess and, by marriage, Holy Roman Empress, German Queen, and Queen consort of Sicily
- Eleanor de Braose (1251), Cambro-Norman noblewoman
- Beatrice of England (1275), Countess of Richmond
- Eleanor de Montfort (1282), Princess of Wales and Lady of Snowdon
- Isabella of Mar (1296), first wife of Robert I of Scotland, after delivering Marjorie Bruce, who also died in childbirth
- Joan of Acre (1307), Countess of Hertford and Gloucester
- Marjorie Bruce (1316), after delivering the future Robert II of Scotland
- Elizabeth of Rhuddlan (1316), daughter of King Edward I and Eleanor of Castile
- Mary de Bohun (1394), first wife of Henry IV of England and mother of Henry V
- Alianore Holland, Countess of March (1405), first wife of Edward Charleton, 5th Baron Cherleton
- Anne de Mortimer (1411), Countess of Cambridge, died giving birth to Richard Plantagenet, 3rd Duke of York
- Philippa of England (1430), Queen of Denmark, Sweden, and Norway
- Anne of York, Duchess of Exeter (1476)
- Isabel Neville, Duchess of Clarence (1476)
- Eleanor of Scotland (1480), first wife of Sigismund, Archduke of Austria
- Elizabeth of York (1503), queen of Henry VII of England and mother of Henry VIII
- Jane Seymour (1537), third wife of Henry VIII, after delivering Edward VI
- Elizabeth Holland (1547), courtier
- Catherine Parr (1548), sixth wife of Henry VIII
- Jane Browne, Viscountess Montague (1552), noblewoman
- Elizabeth Leyburne (1567), noblewoman, widow of Thomas Dacre, 4th Baron Dacre and third wife of Thomas Howard, 4th Duke of Norfolk
- Elizabeth Cecil, 16th Baroness de Ros (1591), daughter and heir of Edward Manners, 3rd Earl of Rutland
- Elizabeth Stuart, 2nd Countess of Moray (1591)
- Anne (Dudley) Sutton (1615), lady-in-waiting
- Jane Savage, Marchioness of Winchester (1631)
- Elizabeth Egerton (1663), writer
- Margaret Brooke, Lady Denham (1667), concubine of James II of England
- Mary Campbell, Countess of Argyll (1668), daughter of James Stuart, 4th Earl of Moray and wife of Archibald Campbell, 9th Earl of Argyll.
- Anne Hyde (1671), first wife of James II of England (she also died from cancer)
- Margaret Godolphin (1678), courtier
- Elizabeth Knepp (1681), actress
- Essex Finch, Countess of Nottingham (1684), first wife of Daniel Finch, 2nd Earl of Nottingham
- Anne Vaughan, Countess of Carbery (1690)
- Anne Chamberlyne (1691), first known British female sailor
- Molly Verney (1696), noblewoman
- Lady Mary Butler (1713), second daughter of the 2nd Duke of Ormonde
- Theodosia Bligh, 10th Baroness Clifton (1722), peer
- Mary Campbell of Mamore (1736)
- Maria, Lady Walpole (1738), second wife of Prime Minister Robert Walpole
- Frances Somerset, Duchess of Beaufort (1750)
- Rhoda Delaval (1757), aristocrat
- Amelia Watts (1770), first wife of Charles Jenkinson, 1st Earl of Liverpool and mother of Robert Jenkinson, 2nd Earl of Liverpool
- Hester Stanhope, Viscountess Mahon (1780)
- Fanny Blood (1785), illustrator
- Mary Wollstonecraft (1797), author of A Vindication of the Rights of Woman, after delivering Mary Shelley
- Ann Griffiths (née Thomas) (1805), Welsh poet and writer of Methodist Christian hymns
- Princess Charlotte Augusta of Wales (1817), only legitimate child of the future King George IV. The obstetrician later committed suicide.
- Esther Acklom (1818), only wife of John Spencer, 3rd Earl Spencer
- Magdalene De Lancey (1822) memoirist
- Ellen Turner of Pott Shrigley (1831), wealthy heiress who had previously been kidnapped by Edward Gibbon Wakefield and forced to marry him.
- Maria Newell (1831), missionary
- Sophia Sidney, Baroness De L'Isle and Dudley (1837), eldest daughter of William IV and his longtime mistress Dorothea Jordan.
- Elizabeth Gould (1841), painter
- Eliza Maria Gordon-Cumming (1842), aristocrat, horticulturalist, palaeontologist and scientific illustrator
- Emma Soyer (1842), oil painter
- Elizabeth Ann Ashurst Bardonneau (1850), first translator of George Sand's work into English
- Joanna Mary Boyce (1861), painter
- Isabella Beeton (1865), author of Mrs Beeton's Book of Household Management
- Evelina de Rothschild (1866), socialite
- Harriet Stephen (1875), first wife of Leslie Stephen
- Laura Lyttelton (1886), socialite
- Bessie MacNicol (1904), painter
- Ida Nettleship (1907), artist
- Lily Hanbury (1908), actress
- Alice Moorhead (1910), one of the first female physicians in Scotland
- Elspeth Douglas McClelland (1920), suffragette and architect
- Gwyneth Bebb (1921), lawyer
- Olivia Burges (1930)
- Louie McLean (1932), motorcycle racer
- Aileen Marson (1939)
- Betty Jardine (1945), actress
- Pauline Gower (1947), married name Pauline Fahie, a pilot who headed the female branch of the Air Transport Auxiliary during the Second World War. Died giving birth to twin sons
- Marie-Louise Berneri (1949), anarchist activist and author
- Franki Raffles (1994), photographer

=== United States ===
- Jane Colden (1766), botanist and daughter of Cadwallader Colden
- Martha Jefferson (1782), wife of Thomas Jefferson
- Phillis Wheatley (1784), first American black female poet
- Mary Jefferson Eppes (1804), daughter of Thomas Jefferson
- Ann Brunton Merry (1808), actress
- Hannah Slater (1812)
- Kalanipauahi (1826), Hawaiian queen consort/princess and a member of the House of Kamehameha
- Nāhiʻenaʻena (1836), Hawaiian princess
- Rachel Plummer (1839), daughter of James W. Parker
- Elinor Jackson (1854), first wife of Stonewall Jackson
- Mary Eulalie Fee Shannon (1855), American poet
- Jane McDougal (1862), wife of John McDougal, 2nd Governor of California
- Julia Dean (1868), actress
- Helen L. Gilson (1868), Civil War Nurse
- Susannah Lattin (1868), her baby was put up for adoption
- Mattie Ould Schoolcraft (1877)
- Minnie Warren (1878), entertainer
- Abigail May Alcott Nieriker (1879), painter
- Alice Hathaway Lee Roosevelt (1884), first wife of Theodore Roosevelt
- Jennie Pond Atwater (1896)
- Lillie England Lovinggood (1896)
- Mary Cowan, serial killer (1898)
- Caroline Miskel Hoyt (1898), second and final wife of Charles H. Hoyt, actress
- Halle Tanner Dillon Johnson (1901), first black female doctor in Alabama
- Jean Webster (1916), author
- Julia Petta (1921)
- Ella Sachs Plotz (1922)
- Kay Laurell (1927), actress (initially, she died of pneumonia)
- Margery Latimer (1932), writer and first wife of Jean Toomer
- Edith Roberts, actress, vaudevillian (1935)
- Marjorie Oelrichs (1937), socialite
- Ruth Harriet Louise (1940), photographer
- Donna Damerel (1941), radio actress for Myrt and Marge and mother of Charles B. Griffith, who was 10 years old at the time.
- Cecilia Mettler (1943), medical historian
- Martina von Trapp (1951), was a member of the Trapp Family Singers
- Mary Welch (1958), stage actress and first wife of David White
- Gerri Santoro (1964)
- Rosie Jimenez (1977)
- Becky Bell (1988)
- Nadine Renee (2004), singer/songwriter
- Marlise Muñoz (2013)
- Sha-Asia Washington (2020)
- Chaniece Wallace (2020)
- Maya K. Peterson (2021)
- Tori Bowie, track and field athlete (2023)

=== Venezuela ===
- Judith Chacón (2009), weightlifter

=== Vietnam ===
- Tá Thiên (1807), also known as original name Hồ Thị Hoa. consort of Nguyễn Phúc Kiểu, the future Minh Mạng Emperor of Nguyễn dynasty and mother of Nguyễn Phúc Miên Tông, the future Thiệu Trị Emperor
- Lê Vũ Anh (1981), daughter of Lê Duẩn and first wife of Viktor Maslov

== See also ==
- Maternal death
- Maternal mortality in fiction
