= Rosie Jimenez =

American student (1950–1977)

Rosaura "Rosie" Jimenez
- Born: August 5, 1950; McAllen, Texas
- Died: October 3, 1977 (aged 27); McAllen, Texas
- Cause of death: Complications from an unsafe abortion

Rosie Jimenez (August 5, 1950 – October 3, 1977), also known as Rosaura Jimenez, is the first woman known to have died in the United States due to an unsafe abortion after the Hyde Amendment was passed. The 1977 Amendment cut off Medicaid funding for safe medically-supervised abortions. Unable to afford a safe and legal abortion at a clinic, Jimenez sought out a cheaper and unsafe abortion. She died at age 27 from an infection in McAllen, Texas. At the time, she was a student who would have earned a teaching credential in six months, as well as the single mother of a four-year-old daughter.

== Biography ==
=== Early life ===
Jimenez was born in McAllen, Texas, to a large Mexican-American family. She had 11 siblings though some died young, including her twin. Before her death, she obtained her GED and attended Pan American University. She became a single parent in her 20s and, when she passed, had a four-year-old daughter named Monique. She hoped to become a Special Education teacher.

=== Death ===
In 1976, the Hyde Amendment restricted Medicaid funding for abortions. The typical cost of an abortion in McAllen at the time was $230 without insurance, which many people could not afford.

In September 1977, Rosie received an abortion from an unlicensed midwife in McAllen. She contracted an infection from Clostridium perfringens as a result of the procedure. After spending seven days in intensive care, she died of organ failure on October 3, 1977.

== Legacy ==
A month after her death, The New York Times published an editorial that stated Rosie Jimenez as the "first victim" that linked Jimenez's cause of death with cutting Medicaid funds for abortion. The editorial stated "The dead woman carried a Medicaid card, but it did her little good. On Aug. 4, the Federal Government had stopped paying for abortions for the poor unless the life of the mother is endangered."

A 1995 compilation album issued by 550 Music/Epic Records called Spirit of '73: Rock For Choice was put together by the activist group Feminist Majority, and the liner notes state that the proceeds of the album went to supporting the Becky Bell/Rosie Jimenez Campaign "to lift consent laws and federal funding restrictions that are forcing young women to turn to back-alley abortions".

Since 1995, the Abortion Access Project has organized Rosie Jimenez Day every October 3, as well as sponsored speak-outs and other events every year that month to remember her.

=== Rosie's Law ===
In March 2023, Texas state senator Sarah Eckhardt and state representative Sheryl Cole filed Rosie's Law. The law would expand Medicaid coverage to include abortion care and contraceptives, and lift a 2017 ban on private insurance plans' coverage of abortion care.

== See also ==
- Abortion in the United States
- Becky Bell
- Gerri Santoro
