= Spirit of '73: Rock for Choice =

Spirit of '73: Rock For Choice

Compilation album
- Released: August 8, 1995
- Length: 62:08
- Label: 550 Music/Epic Records

Professional ratings
Review scores
| Source | Rating |
|---|---|
| Allmusic | 2/5 stars |
| Entertainment Weekly | (B) |

Spirit of '73: Rock For Choice is a 1995 compilation album issued by 550 Music/Epic Records. The album was put together by the activist group Feminist Majority and the liner notes state that the proceeds of the album went to supporting the Becky Bell/Rosie Jimenez Campaign "to lift consent laws and federal funding restrictions that are forcing young women to turn to back-alley abortions". The compilation's title is inspired by the January 22, 1973 Roe v. Wade Supreme Court decision that legalized abortion in the United States.

Each of the songs are covers of popular songs from the late 1960s and 1970s, originally written by such bands as Fleetwood Mac, The Band and Joni Mitchell.

== Track listing ==
1. CB (skit)
2. Eve's Plum - "If I Can't Have You"
3. AM DJ (skit)
4. Babes in Toyland - "More, More, More (Part 1)"
5. Ebony Vibe Everlasting - "We Are Family"
6. Hairdryer (skit)
7. Letters to Cleo - "Dreams"
8. Johnette Napolitano - "Dancing Barefoot"
9. TV Reporter (skit)
10. L7 & Joan Jett - "Cherry Bomb"
11. that dog. - "Midnight at the Oasis"
12. Van (skit)
13. Pet - "Have You Never Been Mellow"
14. Waterbed (skit)
15. Rosanne Cash - "River"
16. Melissa Ferrick - "Feel Like Makin' Love"
17. FM DJ (skit)
18. Cassandra Wilson - "Killing Me Softly With His Song"
19. Sarah McLachlan - "Blue"
20. Indigo Girls - "It Won't Take Long"
21. Lipgloss Interlude (skit)
22. Sophie B. Hawkins - "The Night They Drove Old Dixie Down"
23. TV Reporter (skit)
24. CB (skit)
