= Rwandan reproductive health =

Since 2000, Rwandan reproductive health has taken numerous precautions to prevent maternal and newborn deaths among many other national health improvements. From 2006 on, major changes began in rural areas to provide community-based health insurance.

== Health sector reforms ==
Rwanda has advanced their policies in six main categories: health workforce, service delivery, financing, leadership and governance, medical products, vaccines and technologies, and information. Due to the 1994 Rwandan genocide, a great deal of health related infrastructure and professionals were destroyed, but the government increased the number of healthcare providers from 2005 to 2008 especially in rural areas. As for financing, Rwanda has increased from $16.94 per capita in 2003 to $45.42 per capita in 2008 with funds provided to health services based on performance in prenatal care, postpartum natal care, and transmission of HIV from mother to child. The leadership and governance of Rwanda saw the need to address maternal care and reproductive health issues in order to reduce poverty in the country. Additionally, the government distributed predominately mainstream drugs in order to combat HIV/AIDS. For information, the government developed one database that provides healthy competition between health care providers and tracks their overall progress. The increase in mutual health insurance (MHI) has also led to an increase in the use of health services.

== Maternal health ==
Half of the deaths faced in maternal health are caused by hemorrhage, sepsis and unsafe abortion, with 18% of deaths caused by unsafe abortions which makes it a critical issue in Rwanda. Although, skilled care at delivery reached up to 90% in 2015, proving that Rwanda has implemented expansive health reforms and community-based insurance. Interestingly, female-headed households are less likely to deliver in a health facility which can lead to complications. The likelihood of a woman seeking a health facility for delivery shares a positive correlation with the level of education received, the wealth of a family, and an urban location, while it also shares a negative correlation with employment. One major issue continually faced is the amount of prenatal care received- if there is none or a limited amount, a woman is likely to not even seek professional assistance during home delivery.

== Family planning ==
Family planning was strongly discouraged and widely unknown about following the Rwandan genocide and need for population regrowth. However, a new national population policy was implemented by female legislators in 2003. The Rwandan Ministry of Health launched a new family planning policy in 2006 to provide outreach services and performance-based incentives. Part of this included the government influenced branding of Prudence Plus condoms in outlet stores. These condoms are used regardless of socioeconomic status in the average household. There is also a movement to provide condoms for students in secondary schools. This concept is frowned upon due to cultural standards for adolescent sex, yet some schools recognize the need for condom distribution to promote healthy sexual behaviors. While abortion has been legal in Rwanda since May 2012 for cases of rape, incest, and fetal impairment, many more abortions take place. The average cost for an unsafe abortion is $26 while a safe abortion is cited around $53. The use of the birth control pill has also been put in place since 2010 which has shown no negative results to the quality of life and/or work habits seen in women.

== HIV/AIDS ==
The community-based insurance developed in 1999 in order to protect those with financial barriers (widows, the poor, orphans, and those living with HIV) to extend health insurance to all citizens. Since 2006, all citizens have had access to public health care. HIV focused health care does not have any direct links to the decline of delivery in other health care services. In fact, HIV treatments further improve the delivery of essential health care services, especially antenatal care.
