= Casino Theatre (Copenhagen) =

Theatre in Copenhagen, Denmark

Coordinates: 55.6824°N 12.5921°E

Casino Teatret
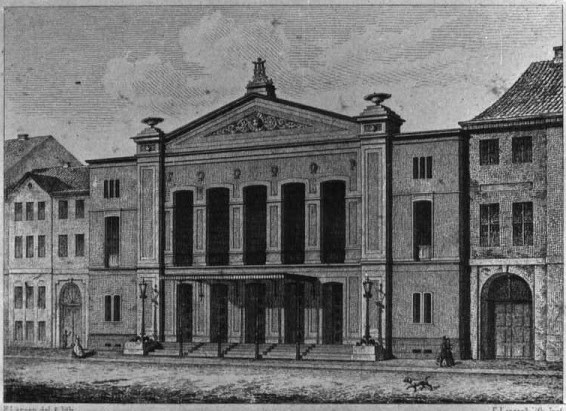
- Main entrance
- Interactive map of Casino Teatret
- Address: Amaliegade 10; Copenhagen; Denmark

Construction
- Years active: 1848-1937
- Architect: H. C. Stilling

The Casino Theatre was a theatre located at Amaliegade 10 in Copenhagen, Denmark. It was built as an entertainment venue by Tivoli Gardens-founder Georg Carstensen but was converted into a theatre in 1848. It closed in 1937 and the building was demolished in 1960.

== History ==
=== Origins ===
Built by Georg Carstensen, founder of Tivoli Gardens, Casino was originally envisioned as a "Winter Tivoli" with a bazaar, promenade concerts and soirées. Carstensen financed the project through the sale of shares. In November 1845, he had raised 200,000 Danish rigsdaler. The building was designed by H. C. Stilling, who had also worked for Carstensen during the establishment of Tivoli Gardens. The entertainment venue opened on 22 February 1847.

=== The theatre ===
The entertainment never gained popularity in its original form and was soon converted into a theatre. The first play premiered on 26 December 1848. The Casino Theatre catered to a broader audience than the Royal Theatre at Kongens Nytorv. It was a place where common people went, often with their children. Its repertoire consisted of comedies, revue vaudevilles and operettas.

Revue as a Danish theatre genre was founded with Nytårsnat 1850.

Productions included Hans Christian Andersen's Meer end perler og guld and Ole Lukøje as well as comedies by Jens Christian Hostrup and Thomas Overskou.

=== Political meetings, carnivals and concerts ===
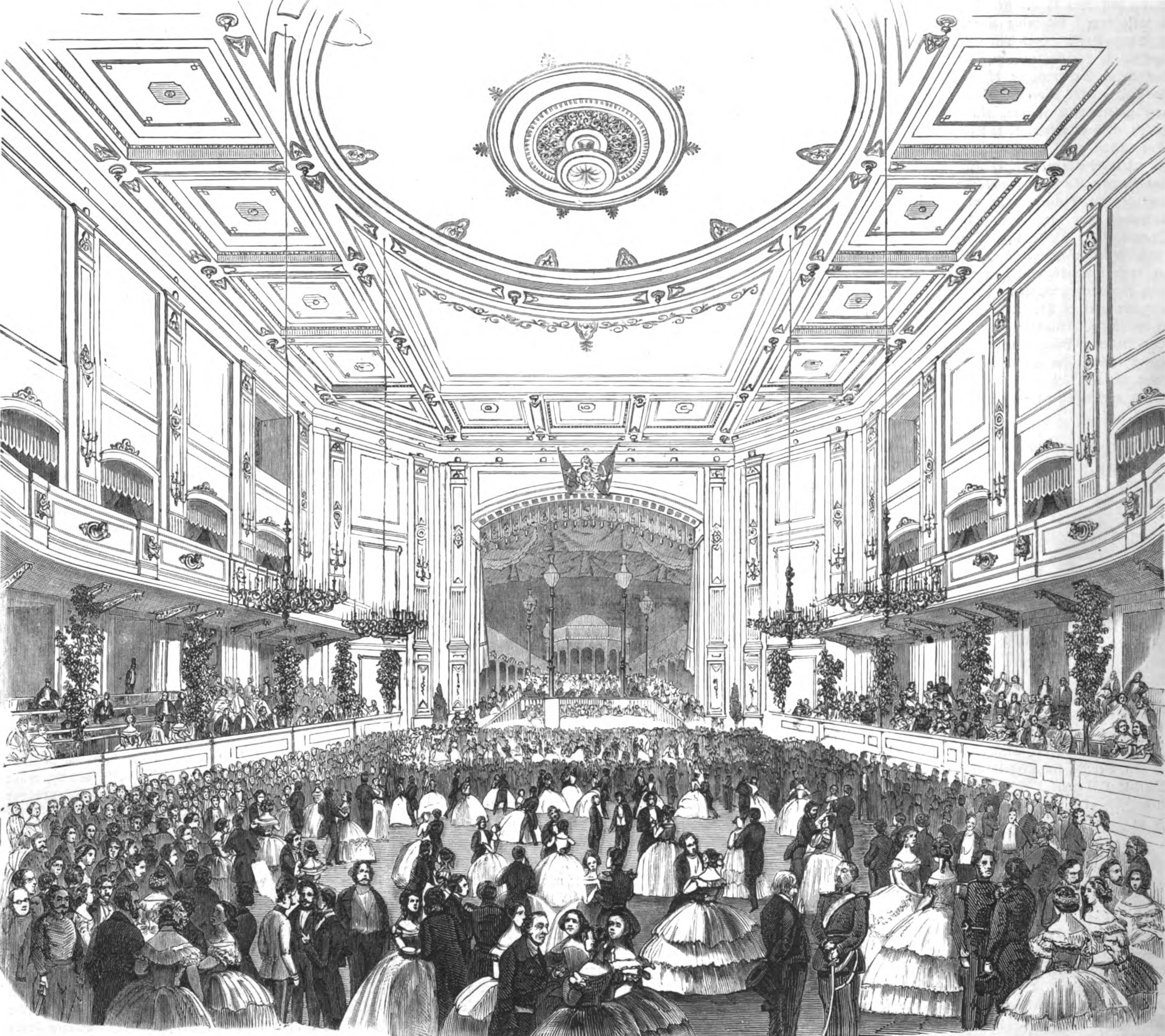
Ball in the Casino Theatre, 1859/60

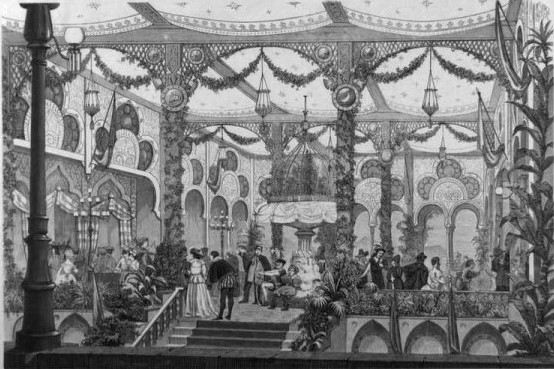
Carnival in the Casino Theatre in 1870

Casino is associated with the Casino Meetings, two public political meetings which took place during the so-called March Revolution in March 1848, culminating in the adoption of the Constitution of Denmark. The first meeting took place on 11 March 1848 at the initiative of the national liberal leaders Hvidt, H. N. Clausen and Tscherning, attracting approximately 2,300 participants. The occasion was news about the political demands made by Schleswig-Holstein at a political rally in Rendsborg. The second Casino Meeting, which took place on 20 March, resulted in the adoption of a resolution written by Orla Lehmann. The next day, approximately 15,000 people marched to Christiansborg where Christian VII had just dissolved his government. New political meetings took place in Casino on 29 August and 28 September 1854, resulting in the foundation of an association for the defence of the Constitution. Another political meeting took place in the Casino Theatre in 1863, leading to the fatal decision that Schleswig should be incorporated into Denmark.

The Casino Theatre was also used as a venue for balls, concerts and a series of carnivals. Edvard Grieg's Piano Concerto in A minor was for the first time performed on 3 April 1869 in the Casino Theatre.

=== 20th century ===
Fritz Petersen took over the position as theatre director in 1904.

The Casino Theatre closed in 1937 as a result of the economic crisis of the 1940s and the growing popularity of motion films. The theatre reopened for a farewell show with scenes from its most popular productions on 1 April 1939. The building was converted into a warehouse. It was demolished in 1960.

== Notable productions ==
- 3 October 1849: Meer end Perler og Guld
- 1 March 1850: Oke Lukøje
- 1935: Champagnegaloppen

== Directors ==
- 1848-1855: Hans Wilhelm Lange
- 1855-1860: Erik Bøgh
- 1860-1862: M.W. Brun
- 1862-1864: H.P. Holst
- 1864-1865: Thomas Overskou
- 1865-1865: Christian Schmidt
- 1865-1869: Theodor Rasmussen
- 1869-1884: Theodor Andersen
- 1884-1887: August Rasmussen
- 1887-1888: Sophus Neuman and Lauridts Stigaard
- 1888-1888: Hans Riber Hunderup and Hans Lindemann
- 1888-1890: Carl Nielsen (bagermester)
- 1890-1891: Robert Watt
- 1891-1892: Frederik Adolf Cetti, Vilhelm Østergaard, Theodor Andersen
- 1892-1893: Sofus Birck
- 1893-1894: Gustav Esmann
- 1894-1900: Richard Schrøder
- 1900-1902: Edgard Høyer
- 1902-1905: Martinius Nielsen
- 1905-1910: Frits Petersen
- 1911-1912: Paul Fjeldgaard
- 1912-1914: Gerda Christophersen
- 1914-1916: Holger Rasmussen
- 1916-1921: Herman-Petersen
- 1921-1931: Emanuel Gregers
- 1931-1932: Nancy Nathansen and Henry Schmidt
- 1932-1933: Christian Frier
- 1933-1934: Svend Borch
- 1934-1937: Kaj Mervild

== Cultural references ==
Herman Bang's Stucco, a roman à clef, contains a mocking description of the Casino Theatre.
