= Becky Bell =

American teenage girl

- Born: Rebecca Suzanne Bell; August 24, 1971
- Died: September 16, 1988 (aged 17)
- Cause of death: Septic abortion

Rebecca Suzanne Bell (August 24, 1971 – September 16, 1988) was an American teenage girl who died of complications from a septic abortion. After becoming pregnant, Bell inquired about a legal abortion but was hindered by Indiana state laws which required either her parents' consent or a waiver from a judge. Instead, Bell either obtained an illegal abortion or attempted to self-abort, leading to a fatal infection. The coroner said that Bell died of sepsis as a consequence of an unsterile abortion. Following Bell's death, her parents became advocates for the repeal of parental consent laws.

== Background ==
Bell discovered she was pregnant in 1988. She went to a Planned Parenthood clinic in Indiana seeking an abortion. There she was told that state law required consent from her parents for the procedure and that most minors in her area traveled to Louisville, approximately 100 miles away, to avoid parental disclosure. She also had the option of going before a judge to argue for a waiver of parental consent, but reportedly feared that her parents would find out. Bell reportedly considered having an abortion in Kentucky, carrying to term and placing the baby for adoption, or running away to California.

On a Saturday night in September 1988, Bell left her house, telling her parents that she was going to a party. Her illness worsened over the next few days but she would not seek medical attention. Her parents ultimately forced her to see their family physician, who diagnosed severe pneumonia and had her hospitalized. She died on September 16, 1988, at 17 years old.

Bell's autopsy revealed fetal matter and evidence of infection in her genital tract, but no evidence of internal injury or marks on the cervix. The official cause of death was attributed to septic abortion complicated by pneumonia. The county coroner and pathologist both later told the press that the abortion and infection were most likely caused by the use of unsterile instruments during an illegal abortion procedure. After Bell's death, her parents found among Bell's possessions contact information for abortion clinics in nearby Kentucky, which did not have parental consent laws, but there was no record of her visiting a Kentucky clinic. It remains unclear whether Bell obtained an induced abortion or induced the abortion herself.

== Parental consent laws ==
Following Bell's death, her parents, Bill and Karen Bell, campaigned against parental consent laws, which they blamed for their daughter's death. The Bells worked with the Feminist Majority Foundation, which credited them with helping to turn public opinion against a parental notification law in Oregon. The Bells worked against proposed parental notification laws in Colorado in 1998. In 2006 they testified before the Michigan House of Representatives in opposition to a pending parental consent law.

In response to the Bells' lobbying efforts, anti-abortion groups argued that the autopsy showed no signs of trauma or infection in the cervix or uterus (signs of induced abortion) and claimed that Bell most likely died of pneumonia which led to an incomplete miscarriage. In coverage of this debate on 60 Minutes, Morley Safer characterized the anti-abortion movement's response as an attack on "the Bells' motives and the character of their dead daughter". In the 60 Minutes interview, John C. Willke, a retired physician and then-president of the National Right to Life Committee, maintained that Bell had a "normal miscarriage" rather than an induced abortion. Willke claimed support for his view from independent experts, although 60 Minutes found that at least one expert cited by Willke had in fact not reviewed the autopsy and did not feel qualified to comment on it. Willke's opinion was disputed on the program by John Pless, a forensic pathologist associated with Bell's autopsy, who affirmed his finding that she most likely had an illegal abortion.

== In media ==
On August 15, 1992, HBO aired an episode of Lifestories: Families in Crisis based on Bell's death, which was entitled "Public Law 106: The Becky Bell Story". Dina Spybey portrayed Becky Bell, Debra Monk portrayed Karen Bell and Craig Wasson portrayed Bill Bell. Spirit of '73: Rock For Choice is a 1995 compilation album issued by 550 Music/Epic Records. The album was put together by the activist group Feminist Majority and the liner notes state that the proceeds of the album went to supporting the Becky Bell/Rosie Jimenez Campaign "to lift consent laws and federal funding restrictions that are forcing young women to turn to back-alley abortions".

== See also ==
- Abortion in the United States
- Rosie Jimenez
- Gerri Santoro
