= Empress Eugenie (disambiguation) =

Empress Eugenie refers to the Empress Eugénie de Montijo, wife of Emperor Napoleon III of France.

It can also refer to

- Empress Eugénie (diamond), a gemstone which once belonged to her
- Empress Eugenie Archipelago, a group of islands in the Russian Far East named for her
