= Rosie's Law =

Proposed legislative act in Texas, U.S.

Rosie's Law is a proposed legislative act in Texas aimed at restoring health insurance coverage for abortion care services. First introduced by Texas House Representative Sheryl Cole in 2019, the law seeks to lift the state Medicaid funding ban for abortion care, include abortion services in the Texas Medicaid program, and repeal the 2017 ban on abortion coverage through private insurance and federal health insurance marketplace plans.

The law is named after Rosaura "Rosie" Jiménez (August 5, 1950 – October 3, 1977), who died from an unsafe abortion in 1977 after the Hyde Amendment cut off Medicaid funding for medically-supervised abortions. Unable to afford a legal abortion at a clinic, Jimenez sought a cheaper and unsafe option, resulting in a fatal infection. Jimenez is the first woman known to have died in the United States due to an unsafe abortion after the Hyde Amendment was passed.

== Purpose and content ==
The earliest version of Rosie's Law, written by Texas House Representative Sheryl Cole, was introduced in the Texas state legislature in 2019 as House Bill 895. It was written to repeal House Bill 214 which prohibits both private and public insurances from covering abortion services.

Then, Senate Bill 8, also known as Texas Heartbeat Act, went into effect in 2021. In response, Rosie's Law was again filed, this time by both Texas House Representative Sheryl Cole and Texas Senator Sarah Eckhardt, in their bills HB 1362 and SB 448.

The proposed law was expanded to require not just Medicaid, but also private and federal health insurance marketplace plans to provide coverage for:

- Abortion care, without cost sharing requirements
- All forms of contraception approved by the Food and Drug Administration includes all forms of sterilization and emergency contraception, prohibits cost-sharing and utilization control techniques, requires coverage for counseling as well as birth control device insertion and removal.

== Overturn of Roe v. Wade ==
After the overturn of Roe v. Wade in 2022, Rosie's Law was again expanded. The proposed updated Rosie's Law introduced in 2023, SB 1314 and HB 3606, would require Medicaid and private and federal health insurance marketplace plans to provide coverage for:

- Abortion care for legal abortions, without cost sharing requirements
- All forms of contraception approved by the FDA, including all forms of sterilization and emergency contraception

The proposed law also would require the removal of cost sharing from these plans, for all forms of birth control including vasectomies and long-acting reversible contraceptives. Additionally, the law would require coverage for counseling as well as birth control device insertion and removal.

== The Hyde Amendment ==
The Hyde Amendment first went into effect on September 30, 1976, about a year before Rosie Jimenez died. The law sparked lengthy debate in the courts, resulting in the issuance and cancelation of many injunctions. Incidentally, a brief injunction halting the enforcement of the Hyde Amendment went into effect on July 27, 1977 but was dissolved on August 8, 1977, reinstating the Hyde Amendment only a month before Jimenez's death. On April 21, 1980, the Supreme Court ruled that the Hyde Amendment did not violate the United States constitution in Harris v. McRae.

== Support for Rosie's Law ==
Rosie's Law was conceptualized by a coalition of three Texas abortion funds: Lilith Fund, Texas Equal Access Fund, and Frontera Fund. Abortion rights advocates claim that abortion care should be accessible regardless of income.

== Opposition to Rosie's Law ==
Anti-abortion legislators denounced Rosie's Law as regressive, and have likened the law to "advocating for Texans to pay for the murder through tax dollars and insurance premiums."
