= Chauncey Northrop Pond =

Chauncey Northrop Pond (1841–1920) was a Congregational minister (ordained in 1866) devoted to missionary efforts in China prior to, and around the time of, the Boxer Rebellion. The Oberlin College missionaries who served in Shanxi Province were Pond's primary interest. Ponds' daughter, Jennie Pond Atwater (1865–1896), served for four years as a missionary at the Fenzhou station of the American Board and died there. In the Boxer Rebellion, Jennie's husband, the Rev. Ernest R. Atwater (1865–1900), her four children, Ernestine (born 1889), Mary (b. 1892), Celia (b. circa 1894), and Bertha (b. 1896), and Ernest's second wife, Elizabeth Graham Atwater were all killed.

Pond held the pastorate at Berea Congregational Church in Berea, Ohio, from 1862 to about 1894. He also served North Bloomfield Congregational Church from about 1894 to about 1906.

== Sources ==
- Our Jennie: Jennie Pond Atwater, by Rev. Chauncey Northrop Pond, Memorial pamphlet published in 1896.
