= Cecilia Mettler =

American historian (1909–1943)

Cecilia Charlotte Asper Mettler (October 26, 1909 – December 1, 1943) was an American medical historian. She was one of the first full-time, and the first female, professors of the history of medicine in the United States.

== Biography ==
Mettler was born on October 26, 1909, in Weehawken, New Jersey. Her father, William Charles Asper, was a lawyer. She learned Latin at the Convent of St. Elizabeth, where she received her A.B. in 1931. She studied further at Cornell University where she received her Ph.D. in 1938. Her dissertation was A biographical sketch of Christopher Gadsden. During this time she familiarized herself with medicine at the Washington University School of Nursing and at the University of Georgia School of Medicine, where her husband, Fred Mettler, worked. In 1939, she was named assistant professor of medical history at the University of Georgia School of Medicine. In 1941, they moved to New York City, where she held a position as an associate in neurology, Columbia University College of Physicians and Surgeons.

She noted that medical history is typically taught either by delivering chronological lectures or by focusing on a specific topic, and proposed to correlate medical history teaching with the teaching of the medical curriculum. Her major work, The History of Medicine, reflected that approach. It was completed after nine years of work just a few days before her death, and published posthumously.

Mettler died on December 1, 1943, three days after the birth of her daughter.

== See also ==
- List of women who died in childbirth

== Works ==
- The History of Medicine: A Correlative Text, Arranged According to Subjects. The Blakiston Co, Philadelphia, 1947
- Mettler, C. C.; Mettler, F. A. (1939). "Henry Fraser Campbell". Annals of Medical History. 1 (5): 405–426. PMC 7939583. PMID 33943399.
- Mettler, C. C. (1937). "Dugas on the Removal of Foreign Bodies from the Eye". Archives of Ophthalmology. 18 (6): 998–999. doi:10.1001/archopht.1937.00850120132013.
