= Ernest R. Atwater =

Rev. Ernest R. Atwater (September 14, 1865 – 1898) was a Congregational minister and missionary to China. He was married to Jennie Pond Atwater (1865–96), who died while in the China mission with her husband. In the Boxer Rebellion, Rev. Atwater, his four children by Jennie, Ernestine (1889–1900), Mary (1892–1900), Celia (circa 1894–??), and Bertha (1896–??), and Ernest's second wife, Elizabeth Graham Atwater were all killed.

Atwater was born in Oberlin, Ohio on September 14, 1865.

== Sources ==
- Our Jennie: Jennie Pond Atwater, by Rev. Chauncey Northrop Pond, Memorial pamphlet published in 1896.
