= Catherine Bagration =

Russian princess (1783–1857)

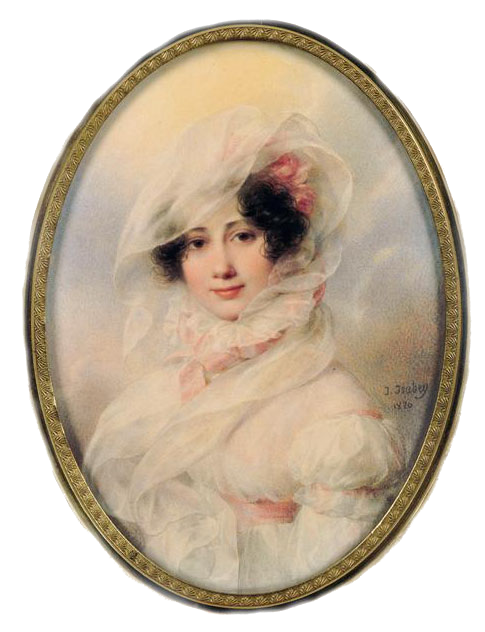
- Portrait by Jean-Baptiste Isabey, 1820
- Born: 7 December 1783; Naples, Kingdom of Naples
- Died: 21 May or 2 June 1857 (aged 73); Venice, Kingdom of Lombardy–Venetia
- Burial: Isola di San Michele, Venice
- Spouse: Pyotr Bagration; John Hobart Caradoc
- Issue: Marie-Clementine Bagration (illegitimate)
- Dynasty: Bagrationi dynasty (by marriage)
- Father: Pavel Skavronsky
- Mother: Yekaterina von Engelhardt
- Religion: Eastern Orthodox Church

Princess Catherine Bagration (Russian: Екатерина Павловна Багратион; née Skavronskaya (Скавронская); December 7, 1783 – 2 June [O.S. 21 May] 1857) was a Russian princess and salonnière, married to the general prince Peter Bagration. She was known for her beauty and prominent role among ladies at the Congress of Vienna.

== Early life and ancestry ==
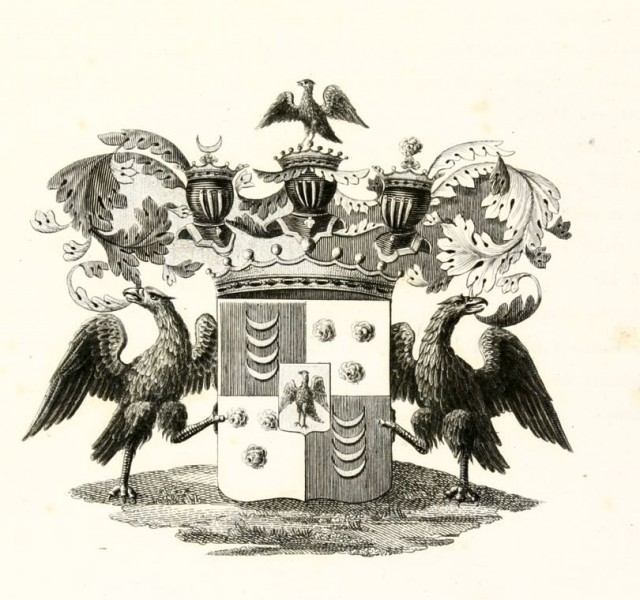
Coat of arms of the Counts Skavronsky (1727)

Catherine was the daughter Count Pavel Martinovich Skavronsky (1757–1793), Chamberlain of the Royal Court and Minister Plenipotentiary to Naples, and his wife, Catherine von Engelhardt (1761–1829). On her mother's side she was a great-niece of Prince Grigory Potemkin and on her father's side the great-niece of Empress Catherine I.

After the death of her father she grew up in Saint Petersburg, where she was educated in the court of Empress Catherine the Great.

== Marriage to Prince Bagration ==
In 1800, the emperor Paul I of Russia, who was well known for his caprices, found out that General Pyotr Bagration, a Prince of the Bagrationi dynasty, was secretly in love with Catherine. The Emperor often used to marry members of his court off to each other, and one day at the Palace of Gatchina he suddenly announced that it was his intention to attend the marriage of General Bagration and Countess Catherine Skavronskaya. The Countess was said to be in love with Count Peter von der Pahlen, and even the prospective groom was shocked. Nobody however dared to argue with the monarch, and the wedding took place on 2 September in the chapel of the Gatchina Palace, near St. Petersburg.

Bagration married the young niece of the great Prince Potemkin. This rich and lustrous partner did not suit him. Bagration was a mere soldier, with the tone and manners of one, and he was extremely ugly. His wife was as white as he was black, and she was as beautiful as an angel, bright, the liveliest of the beauties of St. Petersburg; she would not be happy with such a husband for long...

— General Louis Alexandre Andrault de Langéron, regarding the union

== The "Wandering Princess" ==
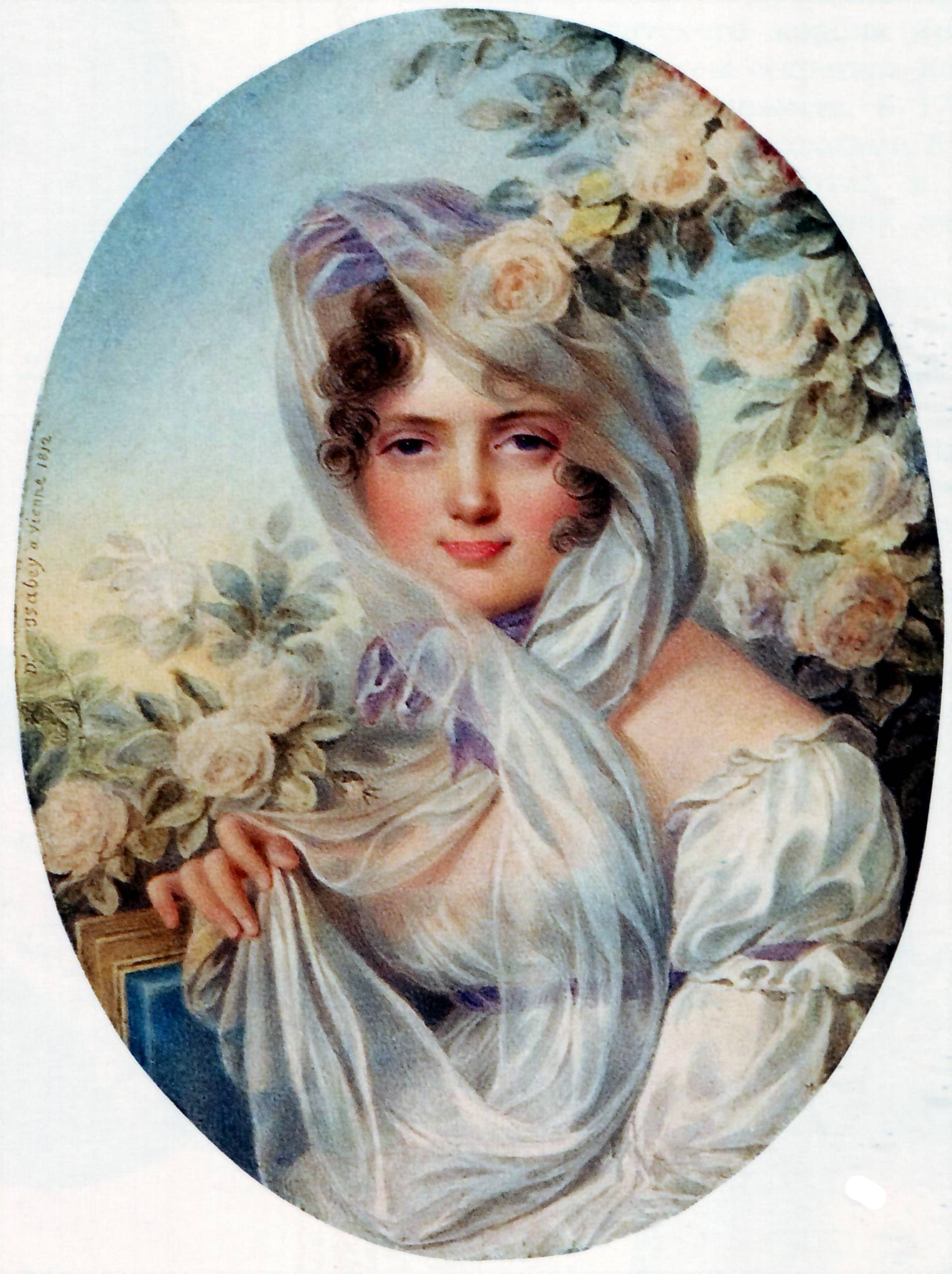
Portrait by Jean-Baptiste Isabey (1820)

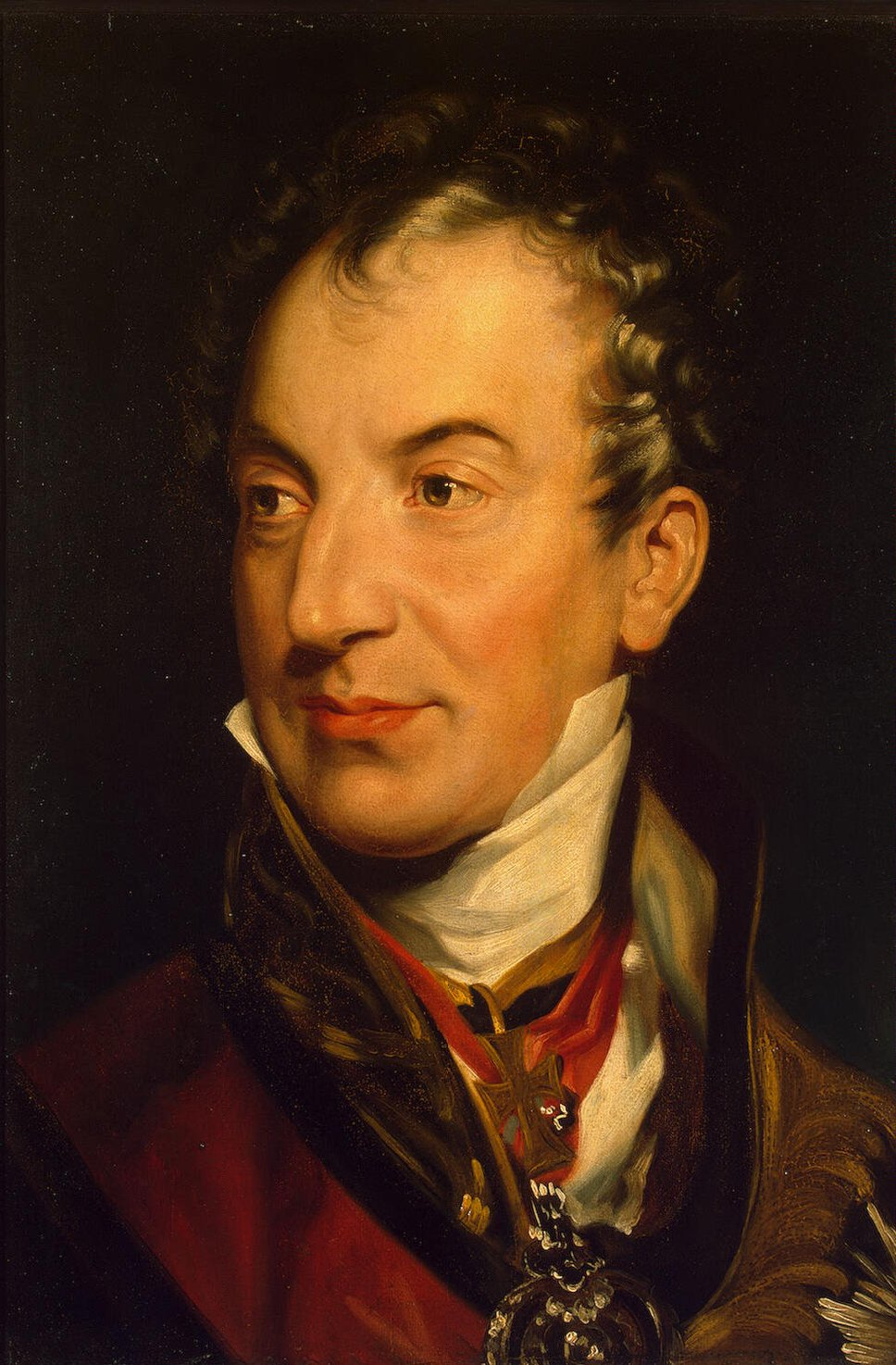
Prince Klemens von Metternich.

In the year 1805, the Princess finally broke up with her husband and went to Europe. The couple had no children. She traveled so extensively that she had a special carriage made, with an elegant ladder that allowed her to climb in and out of it comfortably. It had a bed inside, and all the luggage was placed on the outside. She called her carriage her dormez (дормез) or 'sleeper'; this was the time when she came to be known as "the Wandering Princess". Prince Bagration called her back to Russia a number of times, and sent her so many letters that even her friends tried to persuade her to go; she remained abroad, however, using the excuse that she was sick and in need of medical treatment.

In Europe Princess Bagration was a great success, and became well known in court circles. She became notorious everywhere and was called le Bel Ange Nu ("the beautiful nude angel") because of her passion for revealing dresses, and Chatte Blanche ("the White Cat"), because of her unlimited sensuality. Lord Palmerston noted in his memoirs that the Princess only wore translucent Indian muslin, which adhered closely to her figure. From her mother, however, she had inherited an angelic face, alabaster white skin, blue eyes, and a cascade of golden hair. Even when she was thirty it was said she still had the skin of a fifteen-year-old.

Her husband the Prince, however, refused to hear a word said against her, insisting that the affairs of his household were his business alone; she was his wife and he would stand up for her. Her huge expenditure on receptions and clothes belied her claims of sickness, but he remained a generous husband and continued to pay her bills. The Prince even remonstrated with the Princess's mother, who had become irritated by her daughter's extravagance. In 1808, a military Order was awarded to the wives of those generals who had particularly distinguished themselves in the recent war. Princess Bagration was bypassed, and the pride of her husband was wounded. He argued that Ekaterina bore his name, and that was enough: "She should be rewarded, because she's my wife ...". The Prince paid thousands of rubles for debts Princess Catherine had accumulated from living in Vienna.

There were rumors about her connection with the Saxon diplomat Count Friedrich Albrecht von der Schulenburg, a Prince of Württemberg, Lord Charles Stewart, and others. Goethe met her in Karlsbad, and admired her beauty; she had by then just started a new romance with Prince Louis Ferdinand of Prussia. The Prince soon died in the Battle of Saalfeld, and the princess returned once more to Vienna. She then became the mistress of the influential Prince Klemens von Metternich and had a daughter by him in Vienna on 29 September 1810, whom she named Marie-Clementine after the natural father. While Prince Bagration was forced by the Tsar to officially acknowledge her paternity, Metternich, on his part, made no secrecy of his fatherhood and the girl even lived with the Prince's family from 1814 until marrying Lensgreve Otto von Blome (1795–1884) and eventually settling in Schleswig-Holstein.

== Life in Vienna ==
Princess Catherine was an extremely emancipated lady for her age, and played like a man, choosing for herself which man to take as lovers, and which as just friends. After travelling for many years between one European capital and another, she settled in Vienna. Based there the Princess made her home into one of the most brilliant salons of society, a distinctly pro-Russian, anti-Napoleonic salon. The Princess set up a covert diplomatic post without any official authorization. Her salon was constantly filled with the rich and famous. She maintained a friendship with Goethe and corresponded with him. She boasted that she knew more political secrets than all the envoys put together. Under her influence, Austrian high society began to boycott the French Embassy. Napoléon found her to be a serious political opponent. As a result of her closeness to Prince von Metternich, she was later able to persuade him to let Austria join the anti-Napoleonic coalition.

== Death of Prince Bagration ==
Prince Bagration, despite his age, continued to fight for Russia in the Napoleonic War. Finally, at the Battle of Borodino on 26 August 1812, he was mortally wounded in the leg; he developed gangrene due to lack of treatment, and finally died sixteen days later on 12 September. Shortly before he died he had commissioned two portraits from Volkov, one of himself and the other of his wife. After his death his effects were carefully searched; the sister of Alexander I, Catherine (Ekaterina) Pavlovna had been passionately in love with Prince Bagration, even Napoléon had proposed to her, but she refused because of her love for the Prince. He had refused her advances because he still adored his wife Catherine, and she quickly married her first cousin Wilhelm, later to become King William (Wilhelm) I of Württemberg. Her compromising letters were discovered among his papers, along with an oval miniature of his true love, Catherine.

== The End of the Napoleonic War ==
In 1815, the Princess Catherine greeted the victory of the coalition over Napoléon, and during the Congress of Vienna she held a grand ball in honor of the Russian emperor Alexander I. She was not only his intimate friend but during, and after, the war, she constantly supplied the Russian Emperor with information about the political mood in Europe.

In the same year she moved to Paris, where the secret police kept her luxurious mansion at Hôtel de Brunoy (45 Rue du Faubourg Saint-Honoré) under surveillance. Informants hired to follow the princess constantly sent them reports. One informant wrote: "This lady is very well known in high society due to her political influence and coquetry. On Monday night, quite late, two Poles left her, and one of them, Count Stanislas Potocki returned. Such antics are frequent. .. the Duchess is very fickle. "

She counted many Parisian celebrities among her close friends: Stendhal, Benjamin Constant, the Marquis de Custine, even the Queen of Greece. The Princess's cook for a time was Marie-Antoine Carême, the founder of haute cuisine. The writer Balzac, despite his sloppy dress sense, had been a frequent visitor to Princess Catherine's salon in Vienna, amusing the ladies with his stories, so naturally when she moved to Paris he became one of her friends. Balzac mentions in one of his letters that she was one of the two women upon whom he based the character Feodora, heroine of his first novel La Peau de Chagrin. Similarly Victor Hugo mentions her salon in Les Misérables.

== Second marriage, separation and death ==
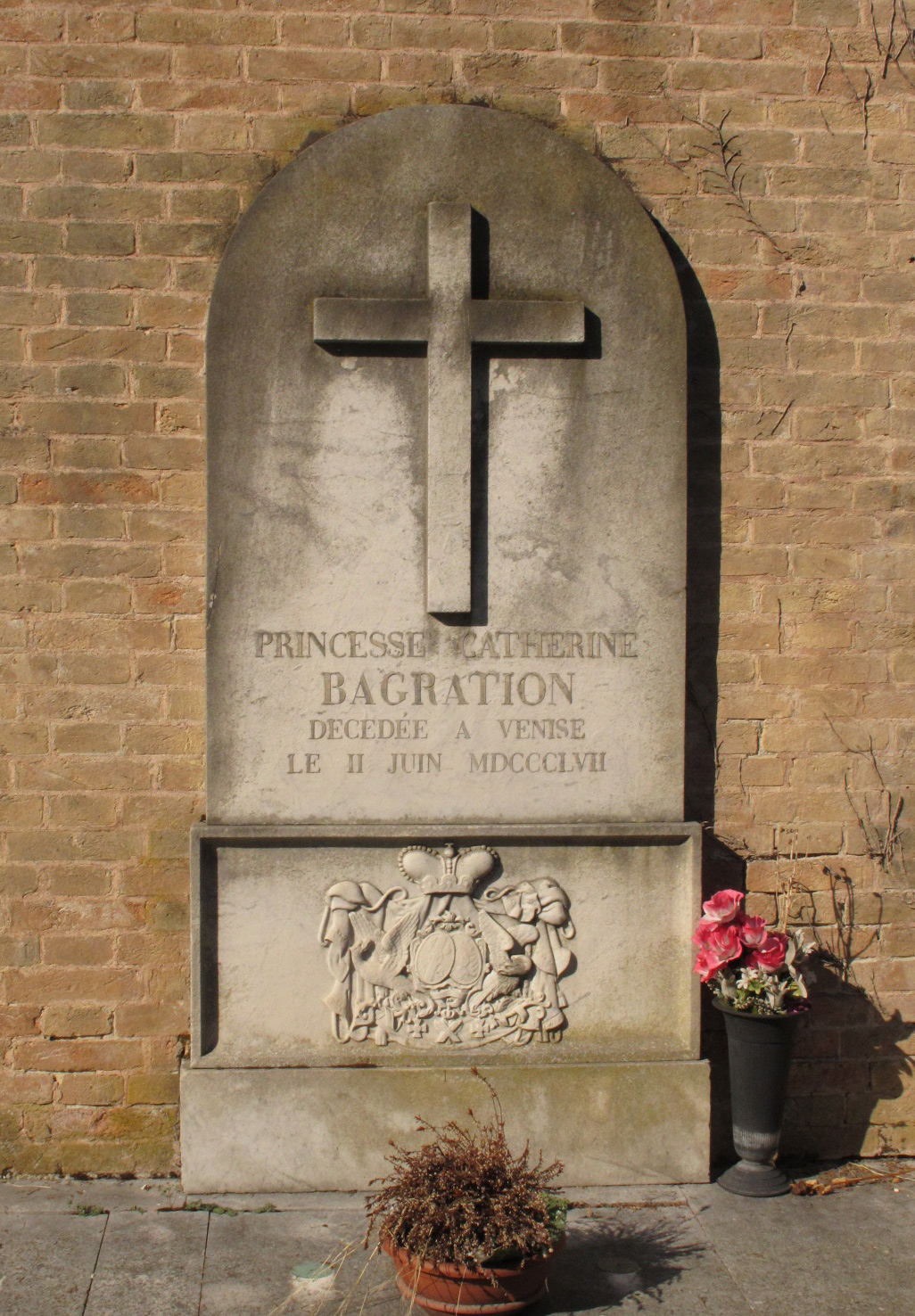
The grave of Catherine Bagration

In Paris on 18 January 1830, she married the British general and diplomat Sir John Hobart Caradoc, 2nd Baron Howden and Grimston; she was fifteen years his senior. For a while her married name became Caradoc. They had no children, and later broke up and filed for a formal separation. By 1849 she was on the move again and visited London, apparently for the first time.

Even in her old age, when her limbs could no longer support her, she would rest with great elegance and a suggestive manner. Princess Catherine was the heiress to the fabulous jewelry collection of her great-uncle, and it is possible that her finances were flagging at the end of her life. She sold some items, including the famous "Potemkin Diamond", which was purchased by the Emperor Napoléon III for his wife the Empress Eugénie, after whom it was subsequently renamed. She finally died during a trip to Venice, on 2 June 1857, and was buried in the Orthodox section of the San Michele cemetery on the Isola di San Michele, in Venice, which is also the last resting place of Sergei Diaghilev and Igor Stravinsky. Her white headstone bears the inscription: Princesse Catherine Bagration Décedée à Venise le II Juin MDCCCLVII (French for 'Princess Catherine Bagration, deceased in Venice 2 June 1857'). Some sources give her date of death as 21 May, but this is the Russian Old Style.

== Sales of jewelry ==
The Empress Eugénie diamond, which she had sold to Napoléon III, was taken to England when the now ex-Royal Family went into exile. When their finances became tight it was auctioned by Christie's and bought by Malhār Rāo, the then Gaekwad of Baroda, India. It remained in the Gaekwad princely family for some time, but at some point was sold again, and now seems to be in private Russian hands. In 1977, the Duke of Westminster purchased a diamond and spinel tiara and matching set of jewels reported to have belonged to Catherine Bagration as an engagement present for his future bride Natalia "Tally" Phillips.
