= Thomas Overskou =

Danish actor and playwright (1798–1873)

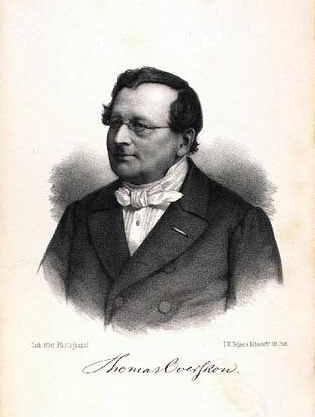
Thomas Overskou, Danish theater actor, theater historian, and playwright.

Thomas Overskou (11 October 1798 in Copenhagen – 7 November 1873 in Copenhagen) was a Danish actor, playwright and theater historian and a titular professor in 1852. His plays are preserved in the Dramatic Collection of the Royal Danish Library.

== Life ==
Unlike his slightly younger contemporary Hans Christian Andersen, Thomas Overskou was born in what was then the societal bottom, and he had to fight a hard battle to come forth in the Danish artistic scene. He was commissioned by the theatre once he had a keen understanding of the requirements for dramatic production. He was not only successful in achieving the position of stage actor in minor roles, and later theater director, but a number of his original stage plays was performed at the Royal Danish Theatre. Capriciosa, as well as East Street and Western Street were some of his well-known solid successes in the Casino Theater in Copenhagen.

Overskou's permanent profit happened as theater historian. His first five-act comedy The Danish stage in its history (1854–64) is a fundamental tool. Also his autobiography entitled Of my life and my time (1868), re-released with notes by Robert Neiiendam (1915–16), is worth reading. Here he tells, among other things, about Copenhagen bombardment of 1807 which he witnessed at first hand, in addition to the story of how he made a career in the theater. He died in Copenhagen. After his death, a road in the Åløkke Quarter, in central Odense, has been named after him.

== Literary works ==
- "Preussens og det tydske forbunds faerd imod Danmark" (attributed to Thomas Overskou; published in 1848 by H.J. Binh, printed by the Royal printer B. Luno in Copenhagen)
- "Preussen und der deutsche Bund gegen Dänemark" (attributed to Thomas Overskou; published in 1848 by C.G. Lorck in Leipzig)
- "Den Ondes Besegrare: Folk-Komedi Med Sang I Fem Akter" (published in 1906 by Kessinger Publishing Company)
