= Leona's Sister Gerri =

1995 American documentary film

- Directed by: Jane Gillooly
- Produced by: Jane Gillooly
- Cinematography: Charles Jevremovic, Jane Gillooly, Andrew Neumann
- Edited by: C.L. Monrose
- Music by: Caleb Sampson, John Kusiak
- Distributed by: New Day Films
- Release date: 1995
- Running time: 57 minutes
- Country: United States
- Language: English

Leona’s Sister Gerri is a 1995 American documentary film, produced and directed by Jane Gillooly. It was nationally broadcast on the PBS series POV, on November 2, 1995.

The film is centered on a photo of a woman dead on a motel room floor from an illegal abortion. The original photograph, derived from police files, has been reprinted frequently in the media and by the pro-choice movement for use on placards at pro-choice demonstrations.

This photograph had, until Gillooly's film was released, been anonymous. The film identifies the person in the photograph for the first time. The woman was Geraldine Santoro. The first part of the film explores Gerri Santoro's life and the circumstances that led her to attempt an illegal abortion. The second part of the film focuses on how the photograph has been used as an icon in the pro-choice movement.

== Production, premiere and usage ==
This story was brought to director Jane Gillooly’s attention by her friend Toni Elka, the niece of Geraldine "Gerri" Santoro (the subject of the film), and daughter of Leona Gordon (who is interviewed extensively in the film). With Leona Gordon's permission, research for the film began in 1992.

The film premiered at “New Directors, New Films” at the Museum of Modern Art, New York and was nationally broadcast on PBS series P.O.V. in 1995.

In 2001 The Museum of Modern Art (MOMA) selected Leona's Sister, Gerri to showcase in "Shaking Up the Box: A Decade of ITVS".

In 2007, AmDoc Presents (a PBS publication) chose Leona's Sister, Gerri to be included in their 20th anniversary POV DVD Collection, by including it as one of the best 20 films from previous years.

== Awards ==
Awards won by Leona's Sister Gerri include:

- EMMA Award - Best Television Documentary
- National Educational Film and Video Festival – Bronze Award
- Chicago International Film Festival – Silver Hugo
