= Gerda Christophersen =

Danish film actress

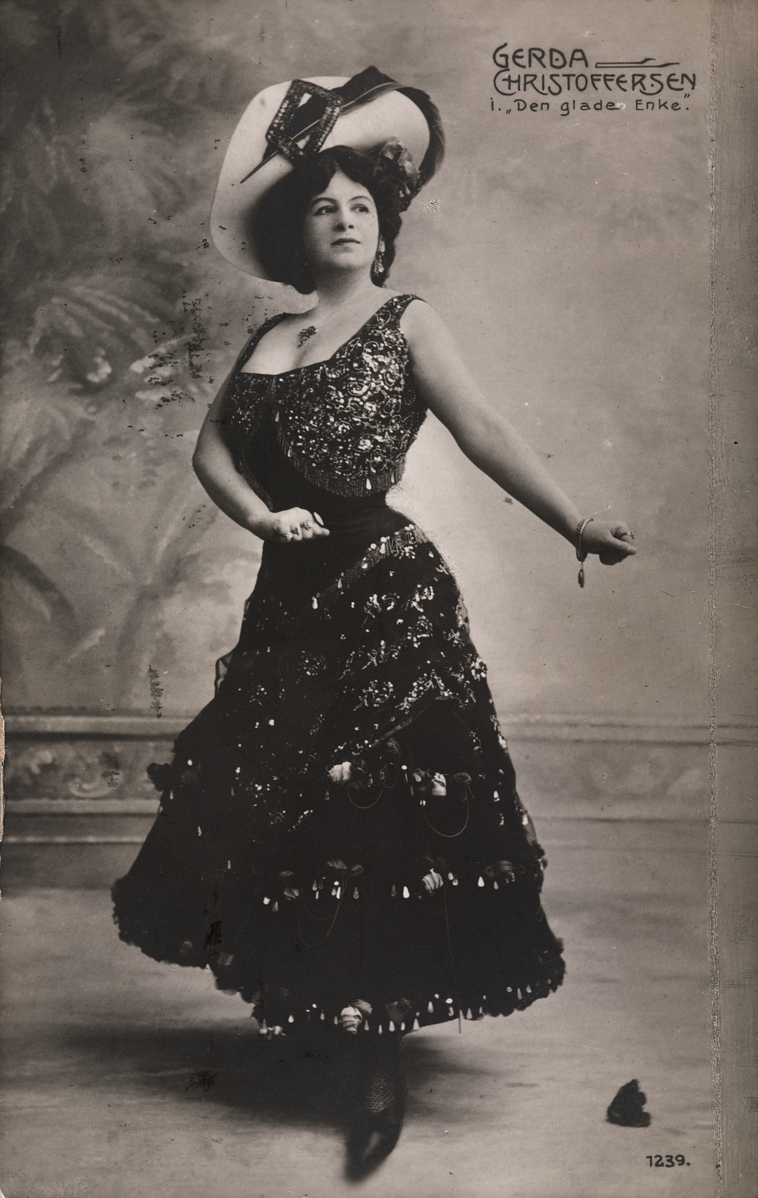
- Christophersen in costume as Hanna Glawari for a production of The Merry Widow, c. 1910–1912
- Born: Gerda Amalie Holst Christophersen; March 1, 1870; Copenhagen, Denmark
- Died: March 13, 1947 (aged 77); Copenhagen, Denmark
- Burial place: Bispebjerg Cemetery
- Relatives: Catharine Simonsen (grandmother)

Gerda Amalie Holst Christophersen (1 March 1870 – 13 March 1947) was a Danish stage and film actress, singer, theatre director, and writer. From 1911, she starred in numerous early Danish films, including 15 from Nordisk Film.

Both of Christophersen's parents had ties to the entertainment industry and she began acting at an early age. She made her debut at the Casino Theatre in 1899, before studying at the Royal Danish Theatre. During her career as a performer, she worked as a stage actress, operatic singer, and film actress. By the 1910s, she had expanded to directing theatre companies and working as a screenwriter.

In 1927 she was awarded the Ingenio et arti. Christophersen authored two memoirs: Memoirer (1919) and Jeg gav aldrig op (1945).

== Career ==
Christophersen began her career as a stage actress at the Casino Theatre as a member of the ensemble cast in 1884. She made her debut there in 1889 as the lead, Gervaise, in an adaptation of L'Assommoir. In 1890 she enrolled in the Royal Danish Theatre's school, from which she graduated at the top of her class in 1893. The next year, she became a regular cast member at the Royal Danish Theatre, taking small parts there until her departure in 1897.

After leaving the Royal Danish Theatre, she began performing at private theatres and touring outside of Copenhagen. During the late 20th century, her father was working to popularise opera beyond the Danish capital. She joined her father on an operatic concert tour in 1894, singing excerpts from Faust, which began her career as a singer. From 1897 to 1900 she toured with Albert Helsengreen's theatre company, gaining fame by singing the lead roles in Frøken Nitouche and Den skønne Galathea, as well as the role of Adele in Die Fledermaus.

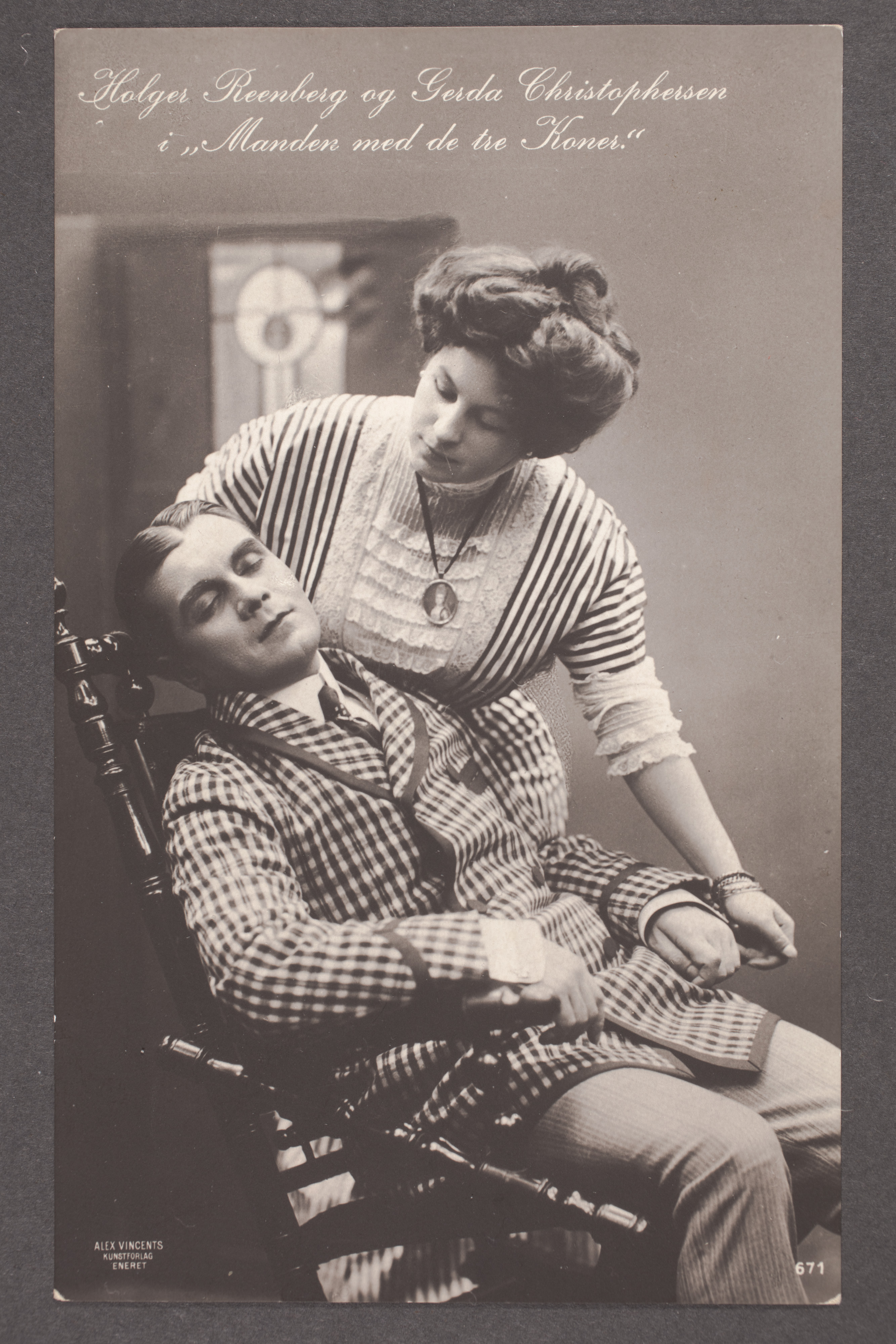
Christophersen performing with Holger Reenberg in a 1909 production of Manden med de tre Koner

In 1912 she became the director of the Casino Theatre, where nearly 20 years earlier she had made here debut. She was the first woman in Denmark to be appointed the director of a theatre (though widows had previously taken over their late husbands' roles) and held the position until 1914. In 1919, she became the director of a traveling theatre company which performed operettas and dramas, starring Ellen Gottschalch and Berthe Qvistgaard, among others.

Despite her successes as a performer and her position as a director, Christophersen often struggled to make a living. The relative instability of the Danish theatre market outside of Copenhagen brought her to the brink of bankruptcy several times. She was known to pawn or sell her personal effects to pay her wages. In 1922, she opened her home to paying guests to supplement her income while not performing. That year, she applied to take over as director of the Aarhus Theatre, but was rejected. In the wake of her unsuccessful application, Christophersen was on the verge of bankruptcy. She managed to pay off much of her debts the following year after performing in Die Bajadere in Horsens. She did not completely pay off her debts until the age of 70.

== Personal life ==
Gerda Amalie Holst Christophersen was born on 1 March 1870 in Copenhagen. She was the daughter of the opera singer Harald Edvard Christensen and his wife Ernesta Felicita Simonsen, who also came from a family of musicians. Her maternal grandmother, Catharine Simonsen, had been a Royal Chamber Singer.

On 9 August 1918 she married actor Carl Worm. The couple separated in 1935. Gerda Christophersen died 13 March 1947 and is buried at Bispebjerg Cemetery.

== Filmography ==
- Den farlige alder as Enkegrevinde Elsie von Lindtner (1911)
- Gøglerblod as Miranda (1911)
- Kærlighed og Venskab (1912, as screenwriter)
- Gyldne lænker as Mercedes (1914)
- Det evige had as Jens' mother (1915)
- Helten fra Østafrikai (1915)
- Hjertefejlen as Fru Holm (1915)
- To mand frem for en enke as Enkefru Fager (1915)
- Den hvide djævel as Asia (1916)
- Doktor Gar el Hama IV as Grevinde Sinclair (1916)
- Ene i verden as Komtesse Luigi (1916)
- Hvem er hun? as Fru Taylor (1916)
- Letsindighedens løn as Rosa (1916)
- Paraplyen as Fru Holm (1916)
- Askepot (1917)
- Handlen med menneskeliv as Fru Gillemot (1917)
- Hvor sorgerne glemmes as Princess Sara von Staffenfeldt (1917)
- Genboerne as Madame Schmidt (1939)

== Theatrical career ==
=== Theatrical roles ===
- John Gabriel Borkman as Maid (Royal Danish Theatre, 1897)
- Frøken Nitouche as Denise (Odense Theatre, 1899)
- Pernilles korte frøkenstand (Odense Theatre, 1899)
- Prinsessen på ærten as the princess (Aarhus Theatre, 1900)
- Agnes Jordan as Agnes Jordan (Aarhus Theatre, 1901)
- Elverhøj as Elisabeth Munk (Aarhus Theatre, 1901)
- Frøken Nitouche as Denise (Aarhus Theatre, 1901)
- Dukken Fru Hilarius (Casino Theatre, 1905)
- Yduns æbler as Freia (Casino Theatre, 1906)
- En skærsommernatsdrøm as Hippolita (Friluftsteatret i Dyrehaven, 1910)
- Madame Sans Gene as Catherine (Aarhus Theatre, 1911)
- Cornevilles klokker as Serpolette (Aarhus Theatre, 1911)
- Elverhøj as Mor Karen (Aarhus Theatre, 1911)
- Frøken Nitouche as Denise (Aarhus Theatre, 1911)
- Flagermusen as Rosalinde (Casino Theatre, 1916)
- Flamme as Ferdinand's mother (Det Lille Teater, 1922)
- Madame D'Ora as Madame D'Ora (Odense Theatre, 1923)
- Madame D'Ora as Madame D'Ora (Scala Theatre, 1923)
- Adieu Mimi as the general director's wife (Scala Theatre, 1926)
- Cirkusprinsessen as Carla Schlumberger (Scala Theatre, 1927)
- Wien as Wien (Dagmarteatret, 1928)

=== Directoral credits ===
- Geisha (Odense Theatre, 1931)
- I begyndelse var ordet (Odense Theatre, 1932)
- Aalborg Sommerrevy (Skovbakkens Sommerteater, 1936)
