= Empress Eugénie (diamond) =

51-carat oval-shaped brilliant diamond

The Empress Eugénie Diamond is an oval-shaped brilliant diamond, perfectly cut, and weighing 51 carats. It is named for the French empress Eugénie de Montijo, who owned it in the late 19th century. It is currently in the hands of a private collector.

== History ==
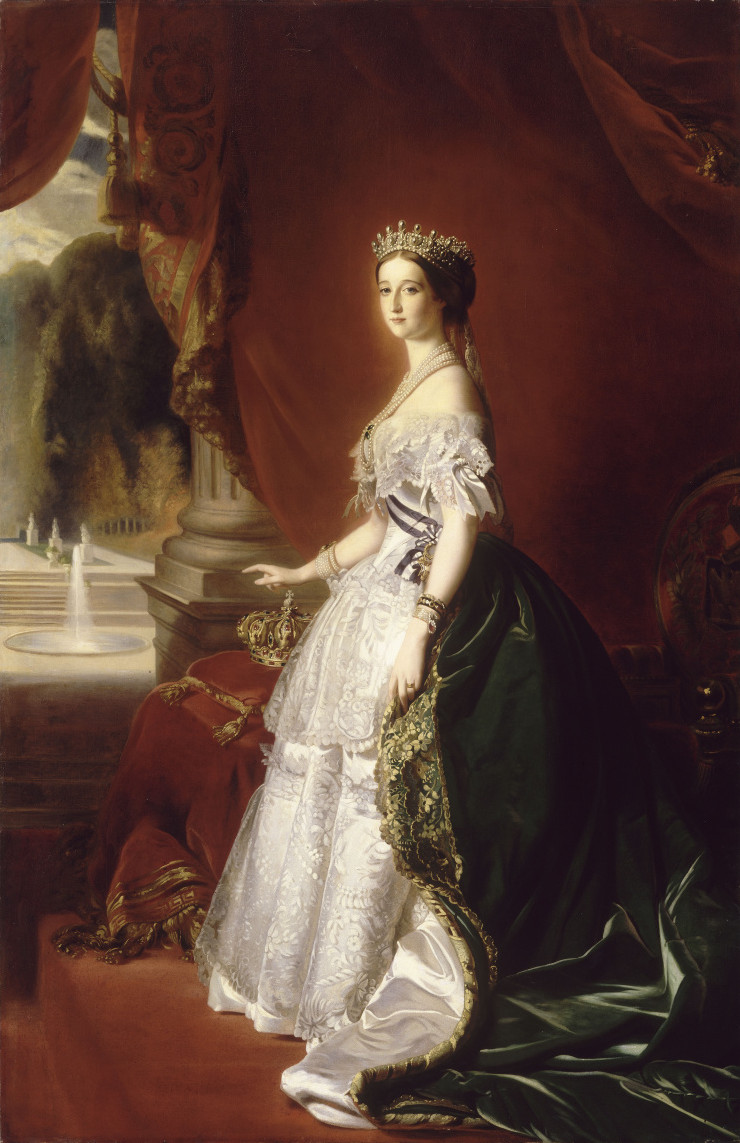
Empress Eugénie in 1853, after her marriage to Napoleon III

The source of the Empress Eugénie diamond is not known for certain, but Esmeraldino Reis, in a book about great Brazilian diamonds, suggests that the rough diamond weighed about 100 carats and was dug in 1760 from a mine in the Minas Gerais province of Brazil. The diamond was quickly shipped to Lisbon, whence it was sent for cutting in the Netherlands.

The finished diamond was first recorded when it was in the possession of the Empress Catherine II the Great of Russia. She wore it quite often at court as the centerpiece of a hair ornament. She later gave it to her lover Grigory Alexandrovich Potemkin, who had successfully captured and annexed Crimea from the Ottoman Empire. For a while, the stone was known as the Potemkin Diamond. As a minister of the Empress, Potemkin acquired a large collection of jewellery, which on his death in 1791 was inherited by his niece, Countess Alexandra Branicka. After she died, it was passed on to Potemkin's grand niece, who would become Princess Ekaterina Pavlovna Bagration.

The diamond was eventually bought from Princess Bagration by the French Emperor Napoleon III as a bridal gift for his Empress Eugénie de Montijo, after whom the stone was then renamed. She wore it as the centerpiece of a diamond necklace.

After losing the Franco-Prussian War of 1870-71 and surrendering to the Germans, Napoleon III was deposed and France proclaimed the Third Republic. In 1870, Empress Eugénie escaped with her son Louis to England, where she was welcomed by her friend, Queen Victoria. After Napoleon III was released, he joined the Empress in England. Empress Eugénie had been able to take some jewelry with her, including the Eugénie Diamond, all of which she had stored in vaults of the Bank of England for reasons of security. The family soon found that they were short of cash and so she reluctantly agreed to sell various items, including the Eugénie Diamond. In 1872, the auction house Christie's sold the jewel to Malhār Rāo, the Gaekwad of Baroda, a princely state in present-day Gujarat, India, for the sum of 150,000 rupees (about £12,000, equivalent to £1.17 million in 2025). After the Gaekwad was deposed on 10 April 1875, the whereabouts of the stone remained unknown, but the diamond was included among other jewels in the list of properties disclosed in tax returns provided to the Indian Government by the late Fāteh Sinh Rāo Gaekwad on 31 March 1988. By 1998, it had apparently been sold to a private collector, and it appeared at a 'Treasures of the Tsars' exhibition in 1998.

== See also ==
- List of diamonds
