= Majida Boulila =

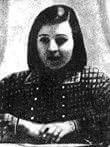
Majida Boulila in 1952

Majida Boulila (12 November 1931 – 4 September 1952) was a Tunisian militant. Boulila, born Majida Baklouti, was a figure in the Tunisian national movement and a symbol of the liberation of Tunisian women.

Boulila was arrested by French colonial authorities for her political activities within the Neo Destour party. She was detained in the Téboursouk camp while she was pregnant with her second daughter. Near the end of her pregnancy the colonial authorities transferred her to the regional hospital of Sfax, where she died 4 September 1952 of postpartum bleeding.

Today, the largest avenue of Sfax and a mixed school (formerly a girls' high school) on the street are dedicated to her. A club attached to the Regional Cultural Committee of the city of Sfax that bears her name works towards Tunisian women's advancement.

== Early life ==
Majida grew up in a patriotic family, known for her affiliation with the Constitutional Free Party, her attachment to the struggle, and her opposition to French colonialism. Majida practiced her primary education at the Sidi Saadeh School, then at the Al Hilal “Arabic French” School in the old city of Sfax, which earned her an educational level that surpassed many of the girls of her generation.
