= Jennie Pond Atwater =

American missionary (1865–1896)

Jennie Pond Atwater. Illustration from the 1896 memorial pamphlet.

Jennie Pond Atwater (1865–1896) was the daughter of Congregationalist Rev. Chauncey Northrop Pond. She was born in Oberlin, Ohio, September 14, 1865. She served for four years a missionary with her husband, the Rev. Ernest R. Atwater, at the Fenzhou station (China) of the American Board of Foreign Missions. She died in China of puerperal fever on November 25, 1896. She was 31. Her husband and all of her children - Ernestine (b. 1889), Mary (b. 1892), Celia, and Bertha (b. 1896) were killed in the Boxer Rebellion.

== Sources ==
- Our Jennie: Jennie Pond Atwater, by Rev. Chauncey Northrop Pond, Memorial pamphlet published in 1896.
