= Catharine Simonsen =

Danish operatic soprano

Catharine Elisabeth Simonsen
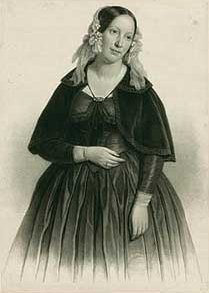
- Born: Catharine Elisabeth Ryssländer; March 7, 1816; Copenhagen, Denmark
- Died: May 3, 1849 (aged 33)
- Occupation: Soprano
- Years active: 1830s–1848
- Spouse: Hans Sophus Simonsen
- Children: Niels Juel Simonsen, Fanny Simonsen (mother of Erik Schmedes and Hakon Schmedes)
- Awards: Royal Chamber Singer (1843)

Catharine Elisabeth Simonsen née Ryssländer (7 March 1816 – 3 May 1849) was a Danish soprano who performed in operas at the Royal Danish Theatre in Copenhagen. In 1843, she was awarded the prestigious title of Royal Chamber Singer by King Christian VIII.

== Biography ==
Born on 7 March 1816 in Copenhagen, Catharine Rysslaender was the daughter of the Finnish house painter Niels Rysslaender and Juliane Marie Strøm, a Swede. Although she was brought up in a poor environment, her musical talents were recognized at an early age. When she was eight, she was given piano and singing lessons.

From 1829, she attended Giuseppe Siboni's conservatory, continuing to receive instruction from him until his death ten years later.

She was given her first singing role at the Royal Theatre when she was just 14, where she played the part of a young bride in Marie. She had a strong, rich soprano voice, and was confident when on stage.

She was signed on at the opera in 1834 and given a repertoire. The same year, she married the violinist Hans Sophus Simonsen after which her career was inhibited as she gave birth to several children. She was forced to retire prematurely in 1836 but returned the following year, encouraged by her audiences.

In the 1840s, as Italian opera became increasingly popular, she excelled in works by Donizetti, Bellini, Rossini and Verdi. Simonsen last performed in November 1848 when only 32, in the role of Donna Anna in Don Giovanni.

A few months later, in May 1849, she died while delivering yet another child. Among her eight children were the opera singer Niels Juel Simonsen and Fanny Simonsen, mother of the singer Erik Schmedes and the composer Hakon Schmedes. Her daughter Ernesta Felicita Simonsen was mother to Gerda Christophersen, an actress and theatre director.
