= Kiliroor sex scandal =

Child sexual abuse scandal in India

In 2003, Shari S. Nair, a teenage girl from Kiliroor, Kottayam, in the Indian state of Kerala, was sexually abused after she was reportedly promised television roles. She was trafficked to many locations in and around Kerala, and was allegedly exploited sexually. Nair later died after giving birth to a daughter.

== Attack ==
In August 2003, Shari S. Nair was introduced to Latha Nair by Kochumon alias Binu. She was subsequently gang raped.

On 15 August 2004, Nair gave birth to a baby girl in Government Medical College, Kottayam. She died on 13 November following medical complications.

== Aftermath ==
On 10 December 2008, in response to a public interest litigation, Judicial Magistrate in Thiruvananthapuram directed Kerala Police to launch a case against Health Minister P. K. Sreemathy, the Chief Minister's secretaries S. Rajendran and K. N. Balagopal, Latha Nair, and the sons of two ministers for conspiring to suppress sensitive information pertaining to the case within the Chief minister's office.

The five accused pled guilty for the attack. On 8 February 2012, they were sentenced for ten years imprisonment by the Central Bureau of Investigation (CBI) special court in Thiruvananthapuram.

The Kerala government requested a CBI inquiry into the scandal. The CBI filed charges against nine people before the Chief Judicial Magistrate in Ernakulam.

== See also ==
- V. S. Achuthanandan
- P. K. Sreemathy
