= Marie-Clementine Bagration =

Princess Marie-Clementine Bagration (German: Marie-Klementine Bagration; Russian: Мария-Клементина Багратион; 29 September 1810 – 26 May 1829) was the illegitimate daughter of Prince Klemens von Metternich and Princess Catherine Bagration.

== Early life ==
Marie-Clementine was born on 29 September 1810 in Vienna as the illegitimate daughter of Prince Klemens von Metternich with Princess Catherine Bagration. By the order and personal involvement of the Russian Emperor Alexander I, she was recognized and recorded as the legitimate daughter of General of Russian imperial army Prince Pyotr Bagration who was a husband of Catherine Bagration, and became an official member of the Georgian royal Bagrationi dynasty.

Her real father served as the Foreign Minister and Chancellor of the Austrian Empire and is best remembered for convening the Congress of Vienna in 1815.

== Personal life ==
Marie-Clementine married Lensgreve Otto von Blome (1795–1884), a son of Friedrich von Blome, on 12 July 1828. Together, they were the parents of one son:

- Graf Otto Paul Julius Gustav von Blome (1829–1906), who married Joséphine, Countess of Buol-Schauenstein in 1858.

Princess Marie-Clementine died on 26 May 1829 in Paris.

=== Descendants ===
Through her only child, she was posthumously a grandmother of nine, including Countess Marie-Clementine Blome (who died young), Karl Otto Arnold (1861–1926), Countess Maria Sophie Blome (who died young), Louis Pius Blome (1865–1930), Johannes Hubertus Xaverius (1867–1945), who married Princess Martha Elisabeth Maria Stirbey, Countess Maria Adeline Blome (who died young), Countess Anna Maria Blome (1871–1960), Countess Maria Giulia Sidonia Blome (1873–1939), and Countess Maria Karola Blome (1877–1951), a nun.
