= Minors and abortion =

Minors abortion law

Many jurisdictions have laws applying to minors and abortion. These parental involvement laws require that one or more parents consent or be informed before their minor daughter may legally have an abortion.

== Minors and abortion in law ==
=== Australia ===
A minor does not require parental consent or notification for abortions in Australia. Western Australia was the last state or territory to remove parental consent and notification requirements, doing so in 2023.

=== Canada ===
In Canada, abortion is subject to general medical legislation, as there are no laws regulating abortion. Access varies by province and by region; though there are no legal restrictions to abortion. Most medical facilities in Canada do not share medical information with a parent without consent of their child who is seeking an abortion. In 1989, the Supreme Court ruled that the woman's partner, the father of the fetus, has no right to veto her decision to undergo an abortion. Abortion is funded by the government.

=== France ===
A pregnant girl under the age of 18 may ask for an abortion without consulting her parents first, but she has to be accompanied to the clinic by an adult of her choice. This adult must not tell her parents or any third party about the abortion.

=== Greece ===
Girls under the age of 18 must get written permission from a parent or guardian before being allowed an abortion.

=== India ===
Minor girls under 18 need parental consent. Under the Medical Termination of Pregnancy Act, 1971, abortion is permitted on liberal grounds until 20 weeks of pregnancy. Abortions after 20 weeks are illegal, but a court may authorize such a late abortion in exceptional circumstances.

=== Italy ===
Parental authorisation is required if the woman is under 18.

=== Mexico ===
Parental authorisation is not required in case of rape (filling a rape report is not necessary), if the minor is over 12.

=== New Zealand ===
New Zealand has no parental notification restrictions on under-sixteen access for abortion.

=== Norway ===
Parental consent is required if the woman is under 16 years of age.

=== Poland ===
Parental consent is always required if the woman seeking abortion is a minor.

=== South Africa ===
In South Africa, any woman of any age can get an abortion on request with no reasons given if she is less than 13 weeks pregnant. A woman under the age of 18 will be advised to consult her parents, but she can decide not to inform or consult them if she so chooses. However, she must give informed consent, meaning that if she is unable to understand the consequences of an abortion she cannot consent to one without the assistance of her parents or guardian.

=== Spain ===
In 2009, the Socialist government passed a bill that states that people aged 16 and 17 must inform their parents (but does not need parental consent) to obtain an abortion except if the child comes from an abusive household and such news will cause more strife.

=== Sweden ===
The current legislation is the Abortion Act of 1974. This states that up until the end of the eighteenth week of the pregnancy the choice of an abortion is entirely up to the woman, for any reason whatsoever. The law makes no distinction with regards to the age of the pregnant woman.

=== United Kingdom ===
Parental involvement laws in the UK; if the girl is seen as competent by medical staff no disclosure to parents is allowed. In most cases, girls aged 13 or above will be covered by this provision but pre-teenagers will not and parents, social workers and police can become involved to protect the child. Around 120 12-year-olds, at least five 11-year-olds and two nine-year-olds have had legal abortions since 1996. In 2005, Sue Axon, of Manchester, wanted the law changed to prevent girls under 16 getting confidential advice. However, the High Court had rejected a review of guidelines which state that terminations do not need parents' consent and doctors should respect girls' confidentiality.

=== United States ===
Parental notification and consent laws in the US Parental notification or consent not required One parent must be informed beforehand^{1} Both parents must be informed beforehand One parent must consent beforehand^{2} Both parents must consent beforehand One parent must be informed and consent beforehand Parental notification law currently enjoined Parental consent law currently enjoined^{1} Delaware's parental notification law only applies to minors under the age of 16^{2} Massachusetts' parental consent law only applies to minors under the age of 16; South Carolina's parental consent law only applies to minors under the age of 17

In the United States, most states typically require one of two types of parental involvement– consent or notification, or both. 36 states require parental involvement in a minor's decision to have an abortion (21 states require parental consent only, 3 of which require both parents to consent; 10 states require parental notification only, 1 of which requires that both parents be notified; 6 states require both parental consent and notification; 8 states require the parental consent documentation to be notarized). In Massachusetts and Delaware the law only applies to minors under 16, and in South Carolina to minors under 17. Parental involvement laws played a key role in forcing the Court to clarify its position on abortion regulation. The Court ruled, in essence, that parental involvement laws (and all other abortion regulation) can legally make it more difficult for a woman to acquire an abortion. But there is a threshold beyond which the increased difficulties become unconstitutional. Requiring spousal involvement before a woman can acquire an abortion has been interpreted as falling on the unconstitutional side of that threshold, while parental involvement has been interpreted as falling on the constitutional side. Or, to use the language of Planned Parenthood of Southeastern Pennsylvania v. Casey (1992), spousal notification laws place an "undue burden" on a woman's ability to get an abortion, whereas parental involvement laws do not.

Parental involvement laws have three basic features. First, they are binding on minors, not adults. Second, they require, at minimum, that minors notify their parents before an abortion is performed, and in some cases consent from the parents. And third, they allow minors to acquire a judicial bypass if consent cannot be acquired. These regulations are but one example of the detailed fabric of abortion legislation and regulation that has evolved since the Supreme Court's decision to legalize abortion in its 1973 Roe v. Wade and Doe v. Bolton.

The first major case involving parental involvement legislation was decided in 1976 in Planned Parenthood of Central Missouri v. Danforth. This case involved a Missouri law that required consent from various parties before an abortion could be performed– written consent by the patient, spousal consent for married individuals, and parental consent for minors, specifically. The court ruled that the parental consent provision was unconstitutional due to its universal enforcement.

The ability of a minor to acquire an abortion against her parents' wishes became a recurring theme in several more cases following Planned Parenthood of Central Missouri v. Danforth. Bellotti v. Baird (1979) addressed a Massachusetts law that required a minor to acquire parental consent before an abortion was performed. But, unlike the Danforth case, this law allowed for judicial bypass if consent could not be acquired. Similar reasoning can be found in H.L. v. Matheson (1981). This case ruled on the relatively milder regulation of parental notification as opposed to parental consent. In this case, the Court ruled that parental notification is constitutional since the parent could not veto the adolescent's final decision to acquire an abortion. In Planned Parenthood of Kansas City v. Ashcroft (1983), the Supreme Court ruled that parental consent is constitutional so long as it also allowed a judicial bypass if such consent could not be acquired. In Planned Parenthood of S.E. Pennsylvania v. Casey (1992), the Court placed parental involvement firmly within a broader set of legal principles governing a woman's constitutional right to an abortion. Parental involvement, and other regulations, were constitutional so long that they did not place an "undue burden" on a woman's ability to acquire an abortion.

In Planned Parenthood of Massachusetts v. Attorney General (1997), the Supreme Judicial Court of Massachusetts found the requirement of both parents consenting to the minor's abortion unconstitutional, but upheld the parental consent of one parent. In 2020, the law was modified to apply only to minors under 16 years of age.

In November 2011, the Illinois Supreme Court agreed to consider whether the state must begin enforcing a 1995 law requiring parental notification. The Court ultimately agreed in July 2013 that the law ought to be enforced, with the parental notification law taking effect on August 15. However the parental notification law was repealed by the Illinois General Assembly in 2021, and parental involvement is no longer required.

In American Academy of Pediatrics v. Lungren (1997) 16 Cal.4th 307 the Supreme Court of California struck down the 1987 parental consent law of the state (which had been enjoined shortly after enactment, and thus never enforced). This case also made history because it was one of the few cases in the legal history of California where its Supreme Court granted a rehearing of a legal case, after it had previously ruled in American Academy of Pediatrics v. Lungren (1996) 51 Cal.Rptr.2d 201 that the law was constitutional.

== Debate ==
=== Arguments in support ===
Advocacy groups have made a number of arguments in favor of parental notification.

- Minors must have parental approval for most types of medical procedures.
- A study by The Heritage Foundation stated that overall, parental involvement laws reduce the number of teenage abortions.
- The pregnant minor might be pressured into having an abortion by an older boyfriend or abusive partner, so as to conceal the fact that he is guilty of rape or statutory rape.
- Currently, the parents of the minor are financially responsible for any complications resulting from the abortion, unless said minor has been legally emancipated.

=== Arguments in opposition ===
Advocacy groups on the other side have also made a number of arguments against parental notification:

- Parental notification and consent laws increase the number of unsafe, illegal abortions.

- Women's health organizations say that in states that have notification or consent laws, there has been an increase in unsafe, illegal, "back alley" abortions.
- Many young women feel they cannot talk to their parents about their sex lives or about rape or incest that they may have suffered, and may or may not seek illegal abortions as a result.

- In states that have notification or consent laws, minors will sometimes travel to a nearby state to have an abortion. Delays mean increased risks:

- Delaying an abortion may increase the likelihood of complications arising from abortion procedures. Major complications and risk of death to the mother significantly increase for each week into pregnancy, particularly if the abortion is delayed until the third trimester.
- Judge Nixon of The District Court in Tennessee estimated "that even under the best of circumstances, the [judicial] waiver process would take twenty-two days to complete – a significant problem given the time-sensitive nature of pregnancy and the increased risk involved in later abortions."
- The American Academy of Pediatrics issued the following statement: "Legislation mandating parental involvement does not achieve the intended benefit of promoting family communication, but it does increase the risk of harm to the adolescent by delaying access to appropriate medical care...[M]inors should not be compelled or required to involve their parents in their decisions to obtain abortions, although they should be encouraged to discuss their pregnancies with their parents and other responsible adults."
- A study of abortions by researchers at Baruch College at City University of New York showed that Texas teens who were between 17 years, 6 months old and 18 years old were 34% more likely to have an abortion in the much riskier second trimester than young women who were 18 or older when they became pregnant.
- Lawrence Finer, spokesperson for the Guttmacher Institute said: "It just shows how laws like this can lead to health risks for teens. Abortion is a safe procedure, but it's less safe later in the pregnancy." He suggest that parental involvement laws have a small effect on abortion rates compared with improved sexual education and birth control access and usage.

- Many minors of childbearing age are sufficiently mature to make abortion decisions by themselves.
- Other reproductive health issues such as STD testing and treatment do not require parental consent.

=== Stance of the Roman Catholic Church ===
In a 2009 case in Brazil, Archbishop José Cardoso Sobrinho excommunicated the mother and doctors of a 9-year-old girl for carrying out an abortion on the girl's twin fetuses. The girl was impregnated by her own stepfather, who had repeatedly raped her since she was six years old. The doctors recommended the abortion because they believed the girl's youth would prevent her from delivering the twins safely. The affair shocked the Brazilian government and provoked disgust from President Luiz Inácio Lula da Silva.

Pope Benedict XVI later gave a controversial speech in Angola where he condemned all forms of abortion, even those considered to be therapeutic. Therapeutic abortion is the term for abortions that are typically performed to save the life of the mother or in which the fetus has been found to have a defect incompatible with life.

== See also ==
- Abortion debate
- Abortion law
- Age of consent
- Conscience clause (medical)
- Emancipation of minors
- Mature minor doctrine
- Gillick competence
- Paternal rights and abortion
- Legal protection of access to abortion
- Teenage pregnancy
- Teenage pregnancy and sexual health in the United Kingdom
- Youth rights
