= Gerri Santoro =

American manslaughter victim (1935–1964)

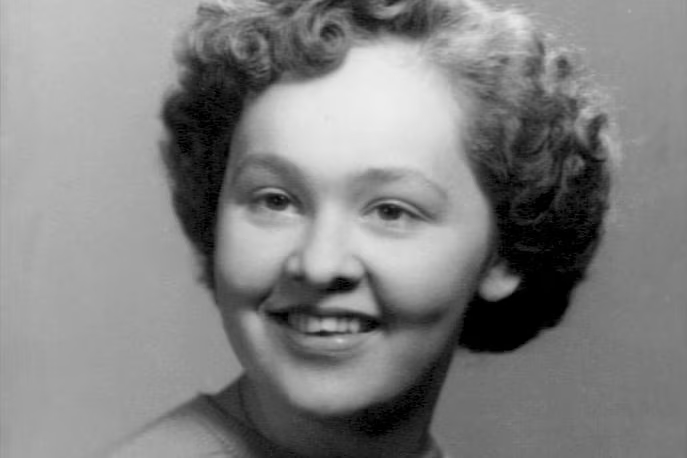
- Born: Geraldine Twerdy; August 16, 1935; Connecticut, United States
- Died: June 8, 1964 (aged 28); Norwich, Connecticut, United States
- Spouse: Sam Santoro (m. 1953; sep. 1963)
- Partner: Clyde Dixon

Geraldine "Gerri" Santoro (née Twerdy; August 16, 1935 – June 8, 1964) was an American woman who died after attempting a self-induced abortion in 1964. A police photograph of her dead body, published by Ms. in 1973, became a symbol for the abortion-rights movement in the United States.

== Biography ==
Santoro was raised, along with 14 siblings, on the farm of a Ukrainian-American family in Coventry, Connecticut. She was described by those who knew her as "fun-loving" and "free-spirited". At age 18, she married Sam Santoro; the couple had two daughters together.

== Circumstances of death ==
In 1963, her husband's domestic abuse prompted Santoro to leave, and she and her daughters returned to her childhood home. She took a job at Mansfield State Training School, where she met another employee, Clyde Dixon. The two began an extramarital affair and Santoro became pregnant. When Santoro's husband announced he was coming from California to visit his daughters, she feared for her life. On June 8, 1964, twenty-eight weeks into her pregnancy, she and Dixon checked into the Norwich Motel in Norwich, Connecticut, under aliases. They intended to perform a self-induced abortion, using surgical instruments and information from a textbook which Dixon had obtained from Milton Ray Morgan, a teacher at the Mansfield school. Dixon fled the motel after Santoro began to bleed. She died, and her body was found the following morning by a maid. Dixon and Morgan were arrested three days later. Dixon was charged with manslaughter, and Morgan was charged with conspiring to commit an illegal abortion. Dixon was sentenced to a year and day in prison.

== Photograph ==
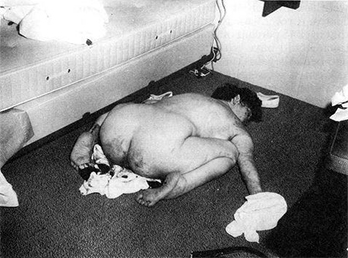
The photograph of Santoro's body taken by the police

Police took a photograph of Santoro's body as she was found nude, kneeling, and collapsed upon the floor, with a bloody towel between her legs. The picture was used in placards and famously published in Ms. in April 1973, all without identifying Santoro. The photo has since become an abortion-rights symbol, used to illustrate that access to legal and professionally performed abortion reduces deaths from unsafe abortion.

Leona Gordon, Santoro's sister, saw the photo in Ms. and recognized the subject. Santoro's daughters had been told their mother died in a car accident, which they believed until the photo became widely distributed. Of the photo's publication, Santoro's daughter, Joannie Santoro-Griffin, was quoted in 1995 as saying: "How dare they flaunt this? How dare they take my beautiful mom and put this in front of the public eye?" Later, Joannie became an abortion-rights activist, attending the March for Women's Lives in 2004 with her teenage daughter Tara and Leona, and blogging in memory of her mother.

In 1995, Jane Gillooly, an independent filmmaker from Boston, Massachusetts, interviewed Gordon, Santoro's daughters, and others for a documentary about Santoro's life, Leona's Sister Gerri. The film was initially broadcast on the PBS series P.O.V. on June 1, 1995. It was later screened at film festivals, opening in the United States on November 2, 1995. In the documentary, Leona expressed that she was initially shocked by the photograph's publication but that "as years went by... [she] thought it was good that it was printed."
