= Unsafe abortion =

Termination of a pregnancy by using unsafe methods

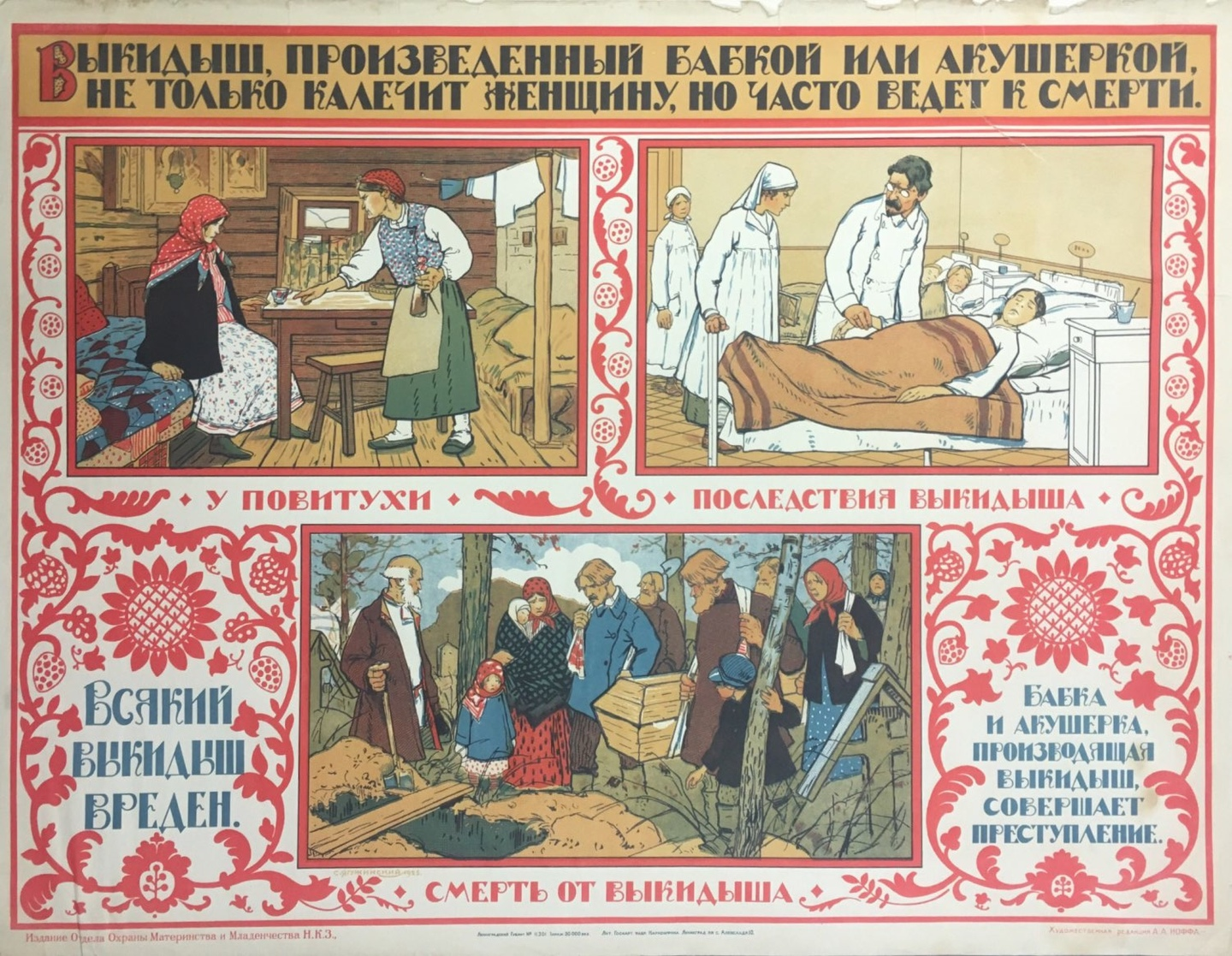
Soviet poster c. 1925. Title translation: "Abortion induced by either self-taught midwife or obstetrician not only maims the woman, but also often leads to death."

An unsafe abortion is the termination of a pregnancy by people lacking the necessary skills, in an environment lacking minimal medical standards, or both. An unsafe abortion is a life-threatening procedure. It includes self-induced abortions, abortions in unhygienic conditions, and abortions performed by a medical practitioner who does not provide appropriate post-abortion attention. About 25 million unsafe abortions occur a year, of which most occur in the developing world.

Unsafe abortions result in complications for about 7 million women a year and are one of the leading causes of death during pregnancy and childbirth (about 5–13% of all deaths during this period). Most unsafe abortions occur where modern birth control is unavailable, or in developing countries where affordable and well-trained medical practitioners are not readily available, or where abortion is illegal, with the more restrictive the law, the higher the rates of death and other complications.

== Overview ==
The World Health Organization (WHO) estimated that for the time period of 2010-14 there were 55.7 million abortions worldwide each year. Out of these abortions, approximately 54% were safe, 31% were less safe, and 14% were least safe. That means that 25 million (45%) abortions each year between 2010 and 2014 were unsafe, with 24 million (97%) of these in developing countries. In 2003 approximately 42 million pregnancies were voluntarily terminated, of which 20 million were unsafe. According to WHO and the Guttmacher Institute, at least 22,800 women die annually as a result of complications of unsafe abortion, and between two million and seven million women each year survive unsafe abortion but sustain long-term damage or disease (incomplete abortion, infection, sepsis, bleeding, and injury to the internal organs, such as puncturing or tearing of the uterus). They also concluded abortion is safer in countries where it is legal, but dangerous in countries where it is outlawed and performed clandestinely. The WHO reports that in developed regions, nearly all abortions (92%) are safe, whereas in developing countries, more than half (55%) are unsafe. According to WHO statistics, the risk rate for unsafe abortion is 1/270; according to other sources, unsafe abortion is responsible for at least 8% of maternal deaths. Worldwide, 48% of all induced abortions are unsafe. The British Medical Bulletin reported in 2003 that 70,000 women a year die from unsafe abortion. Incidence of such abortions may be difficult to measure because they can be reported variously as miscarriage, "induced miscarriage", "menstrual regulation", "mini-abortion", and "regulation of a delayed/suspended menstruation".

An article pre-printed by the WHO called safe, legal abortion a "fundamental right of women, irrespective of where they live" and unsafe abortion a "silent pandemic". The article states "ending the silent pandemic of unsafe abortion is an urgent public-health and human-rights imperative." It also states "access to safe abortion improves women's health, and vice versa, as documented in Romania during the regime of President Nicolae Ceaușescu" and "legalisation of abortion on request is a necessary but insufficient step toward improving women's health" citing that in some countries, such as India, where abortion has been legal for decades, access to competent care remains restricted because of other barriers. WHO's Global Strategy on Reproductive Health, adopted by the World Health Assembly in May 2004, noted: "As a preventable cause of maternal mortality and morbidity, unsafe abortion must be dealt with as part of the MDG on improving maternal health and other international development goals and targets." The WHO's Development and Research Training in Human Reproduction (HRP), whose research concerns people's sexual and reproductive health and lives, has an overall strategy to combat unsafe abortion that comprises four interrelated activities:

- to collate, synthesize and generate scientifically sound evidence on unsafe abortion prevalence and practices;
- to develop improved technologies and implement interventions to make abortion safer;
- to translate evidence into norms, tools and guidelines;
- and to assist in the development of programmes and policies that reduce unsafe abortion and improve access to safe abortion and high-quality post-abortion care.

A 2007 study published in The Lancet found that, although the global rate of abortion declined from 45.6 million in 1995 to 41.6 million in 2003, unsafe procedures still accounted for 48% of all abortions performed in 2003. It also concluded that, while the overall incidence of abortion in both developed and developing countries is approximately equal, unsafe abortion occurs more often in less-developed nations. The most repressive of laws still apply to over 40% of the world population. If found out, these women may face prosecution, and later incarceration.

According to a new study in The Lancet that focused on data from 2010 to 2014, nearly 55 million pregnancies are terminated early and of that 55 million, nearly half, 25.5 million are deemed as unsafe. The WHO and the Guttmacher Institute stress the need for access to a safe abortion for all women and that unsafe methods must be replaced. Africa, Asia and Latin America account for almost 97 percent of unsafe abortions. These regions are often poorer and underdeveloped and lack the access to safe abortion methods. Out of all abortions in these regions only 25% are considered safe. In developed countries these numbers improve drastically. Nearly all abortions in North America (99%) are considered safe. Overall nearly 88% of abortions in developed countries were actually considered safe, with the number of safe abortions in Europe slightly lower.

== Conflating illegal and unsafe abortion ==
Unsafe abortions often occur where abortion is illegal. However, the prevalence of unsafe abortion may also be determined by other factors, such as whether it occurs in a developing country that has a low level of competent medical care.

Unsafe abortions sometimes occur where abortion is legal, and safe abortions sometimes occur where abortion is illegal. Legalization is not always followed by elimination of unsafe abortion. Affordable safe services may be unavailable despite legality, and conversely, women may be able to afford medically competent services despite illegality.

When abortion is illegal, that generally contributes to the prevalence of unsafe abortion, but it is not the only contributor. In addition, a lack of access to safe and effective contraception contributes to unsafe abortion. It has been estimated that the incidence of unsafe abortion could be reduced by as much as 73% without any change in abortion laws if modern family planning and maternal health services were readily available globally.

Illegality of abortion contributes to maternal mortality, but that contribution is not as great as it once was, due to medical advances including penicillin and the birth control pill.

== Frequency by continent ==
| Region | Number of unsafe abortions (thousands) | Number of unsafe abortions per 100 live births | Number of unsafe abortions per 1000 women |
|---|---|---|---|
| Africa | 4200 | 14 | 24 |
| Asia* | 10500 | 14 | 13 |
| Europe | 500 | 7 | 3 |
| Latin America and the Caribbean | 3700 | 32 | 29 |
| North America | Negligible incidence | Negligible incidence | Negligible incidence |
| Oceania ** | 30 | 12 | 17 |
| World | 19000 | 14 | 14 |

* Excluding Japan
** Excluding Australia and New Zealand

Source: WHO 2006

=== Abortion in the U.S. before 1973 (Roe v. Wade) ===
In 1973, the Supreme Court ruled 7–2 that laws prohibiting an abortion violated a woman's right to privacy. The landmark case, Roe v. Wade, changed abortion in the United States.

Early abortion laws generally only prohibited the use of toxic chemicals that were used to cause a miscarriage. The first such law was passed in Connecticut in 1821.

Prior to 1973, the authority to legalize abortion rested with the state governments. Up through the 1960s, 44 states had laws that outlawed abortions unless the health of the pregnant patient was at stake.

In the 1940s, records show that more than 1,000 women died each year from abortions that were labeled as unsafe. Many of these abortions were self-induced. Unsafe abortion practices were such a concern in the United States that nearly every large hospital had some type of "septic abortion ward" that was responsible for dealing with the complications that accompanied an incomplete abortion. Incomplete abortions were the leading cause for OB-GYN services across the United States. In the 1960s, the National Opinion Research Center found that hundreds of women were attempting to self-abort with coat hangers, knitting needles and ballpoint pens, and by swallowing toxic chemicals like bleach and laundry detergent. However, the number of deaths declined significantly into the 1960s and 1970s. The Centers for Disease Control and Prevention estimates that in 1972, 130,000 women attempted self-induced abortions or obtained illegal abortions, resulting in 39 deaths.

=== Cases resulting from parental consent laws in the U.S. after 1973 ===
In 2005, the Detroit News reported that a 16-year-old boy, at his pregnant, under-age girlfriend's request, repeatedly beat her abdomen with a bat to abort the fetus. The young couple lived in Michigan and were evading a state law requiring a minor to receive a parent's or a judge's consent to obtain a legal abortion. In Indiana, where there were also parental consent laws, 17-year-old Becky Bell died from an unsafe abortion in 1988 rather than discuss her pregnancy and wish for an abortion with her parents.

== Methods ==
Methods of unsafe abortion include:

- Trying to break the amniotic sac inside the womb with a sharp object or wire (for example an unbent wire clothes hanger or knitting needle). This method can cause infection or injury to internal organs (for example perforating the uterus or intestines), resulting in death. The uterus softens during pregnancy and is very easy to pierce, so one traditional method was to use a large feather.
- Pumping toxic mixtures, such as chili peppers and chemicals like alum, Lysol, permanganate, or plant poison into the body of the woman. This method can cause the woman to go into toxic shock and die.
- Inducing an abortion without medical supervision by self-administering abortifacient over-the-counter drugs, drugs obtained illegally, or by using drugs not indicated for abortion but known to result in miscarriage or uterine contraction. Drugs that cause uterine contractions include oxytocin (synthetic forms are Pitocin and Syntocinon), prostaglandins, and ergot alkaloids. Risks include uterine rupture, irregular heartbeat, a rise in blood pressure (hypertension), a drop in blood pressure (hypotension), anemia requiring transfusion, cardiovascular problems, pulmonary edema, and death, as well as intense bronchospasms in women with asthma.

== Health risks ==
Unsafe abortion is a major cause of injury and death among women worldwide. It is estimated that nearly 25 million unsafe abortions take place annually. WHO estimates that at least 7.9% of maternal deaths are due to unsafe abortion, with a greater proportion occurring in Latin America, the Caribbean, and sub-Saharan Africa and a lesser proportion in East Asia where access to abortion is generally legal. 97% of these abortions take place in developing countries. Unsafe abortion is believed to result in at least 22,800 deaths and millions of injuries annually. The legal status of abortion is believed to play a major role in the frequency of unsafe abortion. For example, the 1996 legalization of abortion in South Africa had an immediate positive impact on the frequency of abortion-related complications, with abortion-related deaths dropping by more than 90%. Groups such as the World Health Organization have advocated a public-health approach to addressing unsafe abortion, emphasizing the legalization of abortion, the training of medical personnel, and ensuring access to reproductive-health services.

An unsafe abortion can lead to wide range of health risks that can affect the well-being of women. Complications of unsafe abortion include severe hemorrhage, sepsis, perforation of the uterus or intestines, chronic pelvic pain, and infertility. Recent studies emphasize that timely post-abortion care significantly reduces fatal outcomes, yet access remains limited in many regions.

Abortion symptoms that can lead to additional health risks:

- To provide the necessary treatment, an accurate assessment of an unsafe abortion is critical. Some signs and symptoms that require immediate attention by a licensed health care provider include: abdominal pain, vaginal infection, abnormal vaginal bleeding, shock (collapse of the circulatory system).
- It is difficult to diagnose complications that result from an unsafe abortion. A woman with an extra-uterine or ectopic pregnancy may have symptoms similar to those of incomplete abortion. Therefore, it is important for health care providers to refer individuals they are unsure about to a facility where a definitive diagnosis can be made and care can be provided.

Complications and their treatments include:

- Infection: antibiotics prescribed by a health care provider and removing tissue from the affected area.
- Hemorrhage: swift treatment by a health care provider is imperative, as delays can be fatal.

Damage to the genital tract or internal organs: Admission to a health care facility is imperative, any delay can be fatal.

=== Treatment of complications ===
Regardless if an abortion was legal or illegal, health care providers are required by law to provide medical care to patients, as it may be life-saving. In some cases, treatment for abortion complications may be administered only when the woman provides information about the abortion and any and all persons that were involved. In areas where abortion is illegal, people seeking care for complications of illegal abortions may face legal consequences. This may deter people from seeking life-saving care.

Globally, there is a high burden of complications from unsafe abortions. The costs of treating the complications can be significant in developing countries, where, in 2011, 98% of unsafe abortions occurred. An estimated 5.3 million women worldwide have developed complications or disabilities from unsafe abortion, which may be either temporary or permanent. Unsafe abortions cause an estimated 5 million lost disability-adjusted life years each year by women of reproductive age.

== See also ==
- Reproductive health
- Reproductive rights
- Gerri Santoro
