= United States drug overdose death rates and totals over time =

US public health issue

Drug overdose deaths in the US per 100,000 people by state.

Overdose death rates in the United States by county in 2021

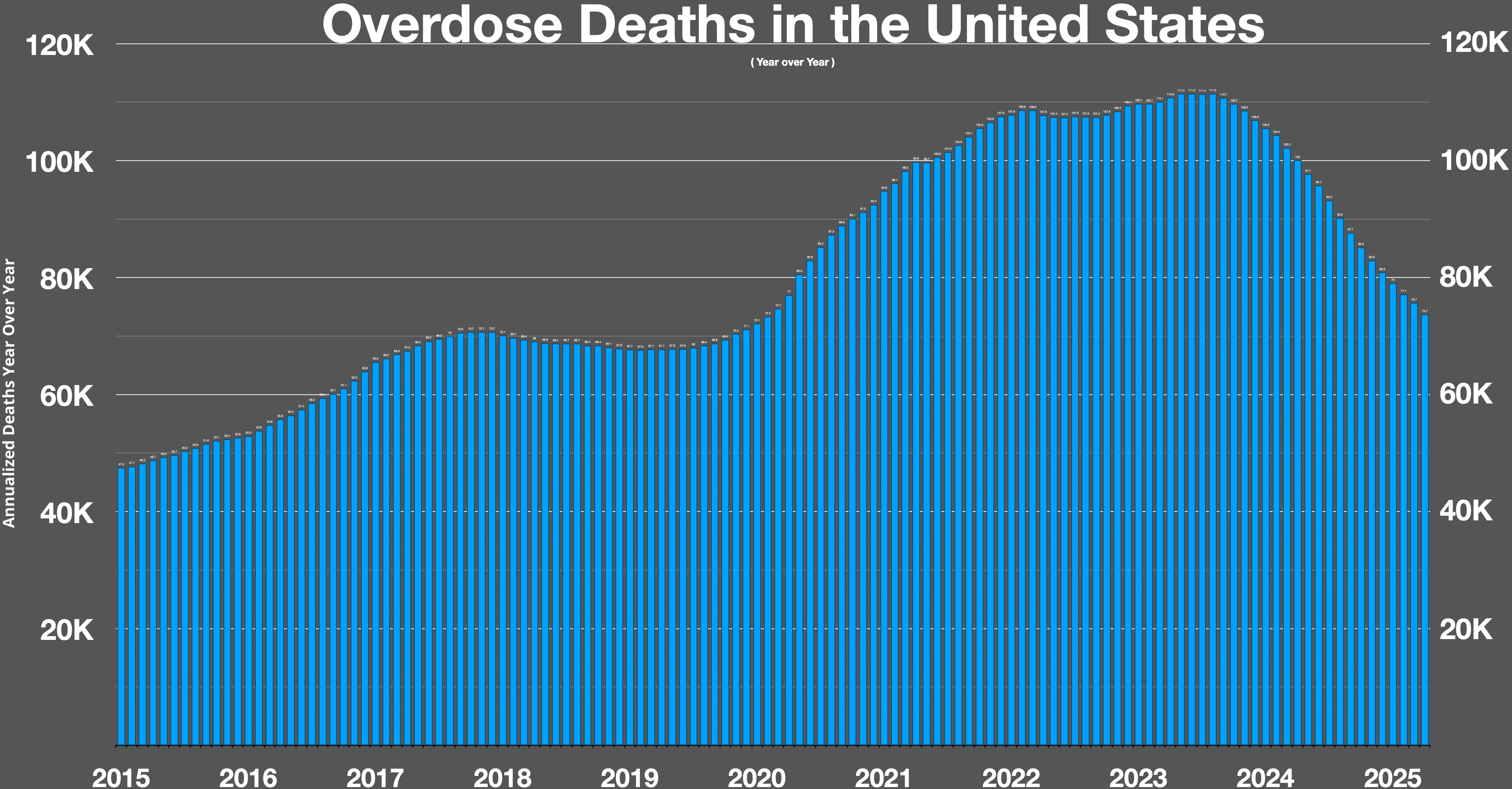
Overdose deaths 2015-2025

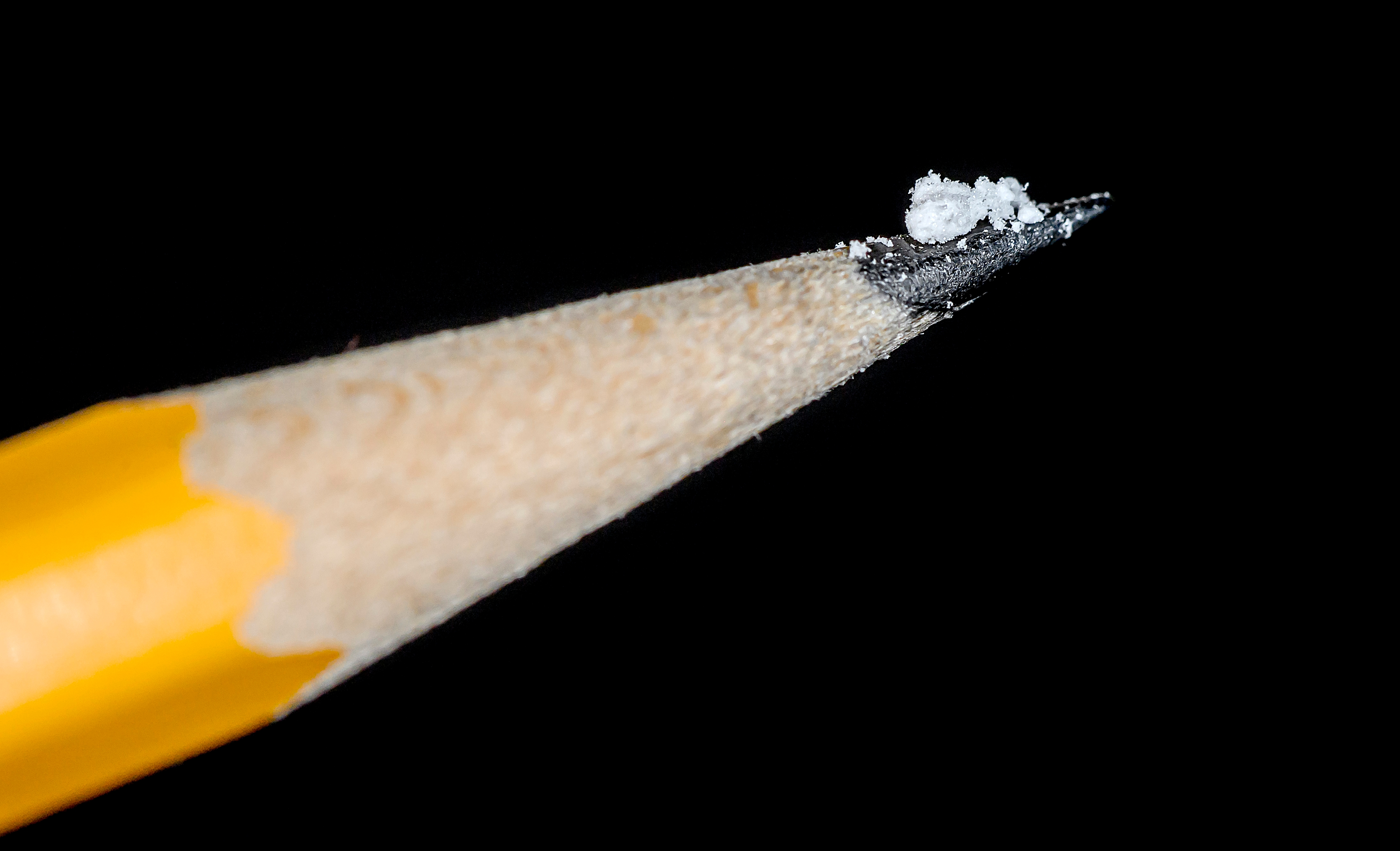
A two milligram dose of fentanyl powder (on pencil tip) is a lethal amount for most people.

Fentanyl. 2 mg (white powder to the right) is a lethal dose in most people. A US penny is 19 mm (0.75 in) wide.

The United States Centers for Disease Control and Prevention (CDC) provides data on drug overdose death rates and totals in the United States.

Around 66,500 people died in the 12-month period ending May 31, 2026, at a rate of 192 deaths per day. That is 19.4 deaths per 100,000 US residents, using the population at the midpoint of that period (342,229,050 on Dec 1, 2025).

The peak was around 110,900 in 2022. The U.S. drug overdose death rate has gone from 2.5 per 100,000 people in 1968 to the peak rate of 33.2 per 100,000 in 2022.

From 1968 to 2020, approximately 1,106,900 U.S. residents died from drug overdoses, with the majority – around 932,400 – of those deaths occurring between 1999 and 2020.

Recent years. Updated often. Crude rate per 100,000. July 1 population.
Year	Deaths	Population	Crude rate
2025	70,000	341,785,000	20.5
2024	81,700	340,110,000	24.0
2023	108,600	336,810,000	32.2
2022	110,900	334,020,000	33.2
2021	109,100	332,100,000	32.9
2020	93,500	331,580,000	28.2

Of the roughly 110,700 drug overdose deaths in 2021 (the total at the time that these numbers were calculated), opioids were involved in about 80,400, or nearly 73%, of cases, with synthetic opioids other than methadone (primarily fentanyl) involved in around 70,600, or nearly 64%, of all deaths.

The CDC's "predicted value" is used for numbers for recent years in the above intro. CDC: "Predicted provisional counts represent estimates of the number of deaths adjusted for incomplete reporting (see Technical Notes)." And the above yearly numbers are updated regularly here as they change.

== 1968–2022 ==
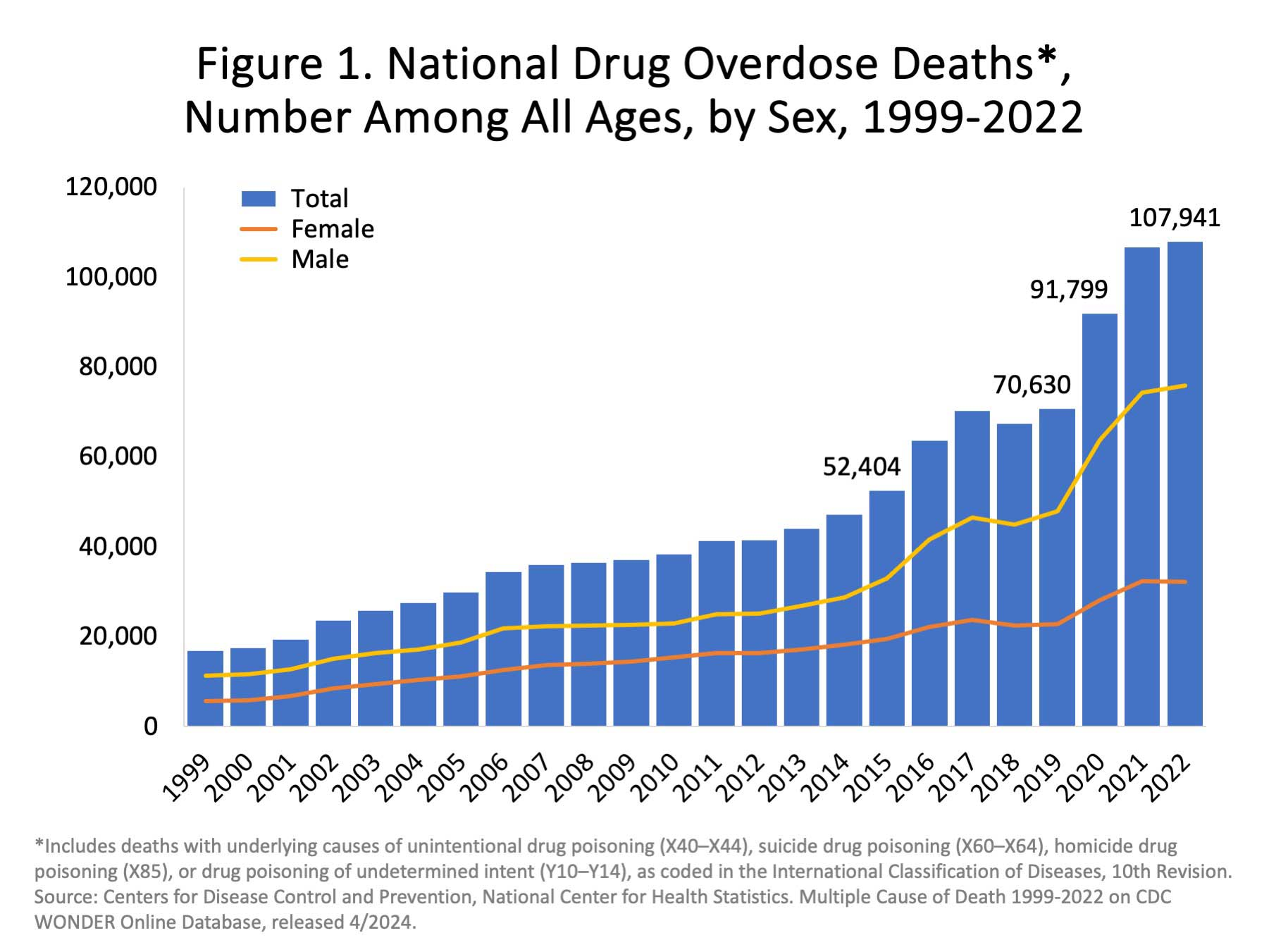
U.S. yearly overdose deaths from all drugs.

The numbers at the CDC source for the table below are continually updated. So the numbers in the table below may be slightly different. 2021 was a turning point in US history with over 100,000 deaths.

- Rates below are per 100,000.
- Population is for July 1 residents.
- Rate (by itself) is age adjusted.
- Total (at bottom) is 1,106,859 total deaths for 1968–2020.

1968–2020 US drug overdose deaths. CDC.
Year	Deaths	Population	Crude rate	Rate
1968	5,033	199,533,564	2.5	2.8
1969	6,006	201,568,206	3.0	3.3
1970	7,101	203,458,035	3.5	3.8
1971	6,771	206,782,970	3.3	3.5
1972	6,622	209,237,411	3.2	3.4
1973	6,413	211,361,965	3.0	3.2
1974	6,449	213,436,958	3.0	3.2
1975	7,145	215,457,198	3.3	3.4
1976	6,765	217,615,788	3.1	3.2
1977	6,130	219,808,632	2.8	2.9
1978	5,506	222,102,279	2.5	2.6
1979	2,544	224,635,398	1.1	1.1
1980	2,492	226,624,371	1.1	1.1
1981	2,668	229,487,512	1.2	1.2
1982	2,862	231,701,425	1.2	1.2
1983	2,866	233,781,743	1.2	1.2
1984	3,266	235,922,142	1.4	1.3
1985	3,612	238,005,715	1.5	1.5
1986	4,187	240,189,882	1.7	1.7
1987	3,907	242,395,034	1.6	1.6
1988	4,865	244,651,961	2.0	2.0
1989	5,035	247,001,762	2.0	2.0
1990	4,506	248,922,111	1.8	1.8
1991	5,215	253,088,068	2.1	2.0
1992	5,951	256,606,463	2.3	2.3
1993	7,382	260,024,637	2.8	2.8
1994	7,828	263,241,475	3.0	3.0
1995	8,000	266,386,596	3.0	3.0
1996	8,431	269,540,779	3.1	3.1
1997	9,099	272,776,678	3.3	3.3
1998	9,838	276,032,848	3.6	3.6
1999	16,849	279,040,168	6.0	6.1
2000	17,415	281,421,906	6.2	6.2
2001	19,394	284,968,955	6.8	6.8
2002	23,518	287,625,193	8.2	8.2
2003	25,785	290,107,933	8.9	8.9
2004	27,424	292,805,298	9.4	9.4
2005	29,813	295,516,599	10.1	10.1
2006	34,425	298,379,912	11.5	11.5
2007	36,010	301,231,207	12.0	11.9
2008	36,450	304,093,966	12.0	11.9
2009	37,004	306,771,529	12.1	11.9
2010	38,329	308,745,538	12.4	12.3
2011	41,340	311,591,917	13.3	13.2
2012	41,502	313,914,040	13.2	13.1
2013	43,982	316,128,839	13.9	13.8
2014	47,055	318,857,056	14.8	14.7
2015	52,404	321,418,820	16.3	16.3
2016	63,632	323,127,513	19.7	19.8
2017	70,237	325,719,178	21.6	21.7
2018	67,367	327,167,434	20.6	20.7
2019	70,630	328,239,523	21.5	21.6
2020	91,799	329,484,123	27.9	28.3
Total	1,106,859			

== Death rates by state and year ==
- Asterisks (*) indicate Health in LOCATION or Healthcare in LOCATION links in table below.
- NSD: Not sufficient data. NR: Not reported, or not recorded.

Drug overdose death rates per 100,000 population by state. 1999-2024. Age adjusted. CDC.
Location	2024	2023	2022	2021	2020	2019	2018	2017	2016	2015	2014	2013	2012	2011	2010	2009	2008	2007	2006	2005	2004	2003	2002	2001	2000	1999
United States *	23.1	31.3	32.6	32.4	28.3	21.6	20.7	21.7	19.8	16.3	14.7	13.8	13.1	13.2	12.3	11.9	11.9	11.9	11.5	10.1	9.4	8.9	8.2	6.8	6.2	6.1
Alabama *	25.0	33.9	31.5	30.1	22.3	16.3	16.6	18.0	16.2	15.7	15.2	12.7	12.1	11.8	11.8	13.6	13.0	11.1	8.7	6.3	6.4	4.4	4.8	4.9	4.5	3.9
Alaska *	45.1	49.4	34.3	35.6	22.0	17.8	14.6	20.2	16.8	16.0	16.8	14.4	17.4	14.2	11.6	17.9	18.1	10.1	11.1	11.4	12.7	12.7	12.2	9.4	7.1	7.5
Arizona	32.6	36.1	37.2	38.7	35.8	26.8	23.8	22.2	20.3	19.0	18.2	18.7	17.7	16.9	17.5	16.1	13.5	15.7	14.9	14.1	13.7	12.7	12.0	10.9	10.6	10.6
Arkansas *	13.9	17.7	21.7	22.3	19.1	13.5	15.7	15.5	14.0	13.8	12.6	11.1	13.1	12.6	12.5	12.6	13.1	10.9	10.5	10.1	8.7	7.0	6.8	4.8	5.4	4.4
California *	21.7	27.9	26.9	26.6	21.8	15.0	12.8	11.7	11.2	11.3	11.1	11.1	10.3	10.7	10.6	10.7	10.4	10.5	9.6	9.0	8.8	8.9	8.7	3.6	5.8	8.1
Colorado *	25.7	30.6	29.8	31.4	24.9	18.0	16.8	17.6	16.6	15.4	16.3	15.5	15.0	16.1	12.7	15.0	14.8	14.7	12.8	12.7	10.9	10.7	9.7	9.0	7.9	8.0
Connecticut	26.2	35.2	40.3	42.3	39.1	34.7	30.7	30.9	27.4	22.1	17.6	16.0	12.1	11.2	10.1	11.0	10.7	12.2	11.5	8.5	9.6	8.8	10.3	8.8	9.2	9.0
Delaware	33.4	53.0	55.3	54.0	47.3	48.0	43.8	37.0	30.8	22.0	20.9	18.7	15.2	17.6	16.6	15.4	14.3	11.4	9.4	7.5	7.6	9.4	10.5	8.0	7.0	6.4
Florida *	21.3	31.7	35.2	37.5	35.0	25.5	22.8	25.1	23.7	16.2	13.2	12.6	13.3	15.4	16.4	16.7	16.2	15.4	14.4	13.5	13.2	12.4	11.8	10.9	7.4	6.4
Georgia *	18.1	23.6	24.9	23.5	18.0	13.1	13.2	14.7	13.3	12.7	11.9	10.8	10.6	10.7	10.7	10.3	9.7	9.7	8.9	8.2	7.5	6.9	6.5	6.0	4.4	3.5
Hawaii *	21.0	21.4	18.6	17.3	18.3	15.9	14.3	13.8	12.8	11.3	10.9	11.0	11.0	12.4	10.9	9.6	9.0	10.0	6.4	9.4	8.0	7.1	6.1	6.2	5.1	6.5
Idaho *	17.3	20.5	20.7	19.0	15.9	15.1	14.6	14.4	15.2	14.2	13.7	13.4	11.9	12.9	11.8	11.6	9.8	8.6	9.3	8.1	7.4	7.9	9.1	7.8	5.1	5.3
Illinois	19.3	27.3	30.0	29.0	28.1	21.9	21.3	21.6	18.9	14.1	13.1	12.1	12.5	10.9	10.0	10.8	10.6	9.4	10.9	8.4	8.3	6.8	7.9	7.1	7.0	6.7
Indiana	25.7	34.2	41.0	43.0	36.7	26.6	25.6	29.4	24.0	19.5	18.2	16.6	16.0	15.3	14.4	14.0	13.2	12.4	11.8	9.8	8.8	7.1	4.8	4.7	3.5	3.2
Iowa *	13.7	14.9	15.3	15.3	14.3	11.5	9.6	11.5	10.6	10.3	8.8	9.3	8.7	8.4	8.6	7.1	7.2	6.9	6.6	4.8	4.2	3.4	3.1	3.0	2.5	1.9
Kansas	19.7	22.8	26.5	24.3	17.4	14.3	12.4	11.8	11.1	11.8	11.7	12.0	11.5	10.1	9.6	11.1	8.0	10.0	9.5	9.1	8.5	7.1	6.4	5.3	4.0	3.4
Kentucky	33.5	48.0	53.2	55.6	49.2	32.5	30.9	37.2	33.5	29.9	24.7	23.7	25.0	25.0	23.6	18.0	17.9	16.7	17.4	15.3	12.8	13.6	10.5	8.4	5.9	4.9
Louisiana	33.5	50.6	54.5	55.9	42.7	28.3	25.4	24.5	21.8	19.0	16.9	17.8	12.3	13.5	13.2	13.1	14.9	18.8	16.5	14.7	12.1	12.1	8.3	6.0	5.6	4.3
Maine	35.2	44.9	54.3	47.1	39.7	29.9	27.9	34.4	28.7	21.2	16.8	13.2	11.5	11.8	10.4	12.7	12.3	12.4	12.0	12.4	11.0	10.3	10.9	6.5	4.8	5.3
Maryland *	26.9	39.3	40.3	42.8	44.6	38.2	37.2	36.3	33.2	20.9	17.4	14.6	13.7	11.7	11.0	12.5	11.8	13.2	13.2	11.4	11.9	13.8	12.9	11.5	11.3	11.4
Massachusetts *	21.8	33.6	37.4	36.8	33.9	32.1	32.8	31.8	33.0	25.7	19.0	16.0	12.7	12.7	11.0	12.2	11.9	14.0	14.7	12.0	10.3	12.6	10.7	10.5	7.1	7.5
Michigan	19.1	28.9	30.7	31.5	28.6	24.4	26.6	27.8	24.4	20.4	18.0	15.9	13.5	14.3	13.9	14.5	12.4	12.2	11.7	9.8	8.7	7.6	7.5	6.2	5.6	4.6
Minnesota *	17.3	23.6	24.8	24.5	19.0	14.2	11.5	13.3	12.5	10.6	9.6	9.6	8.9	9.4	7.3	7.9	7.2	6.4	5.9	5.4	4.8	4.8	3.9	3.7	2.6	2.8
Mississippi *	18.6	25.3	27.6	28.4	21.1	13.6	10.8	12.2	12.1	12.3	11.6	10.8	10.7	10.7	11.4	11.2	10.5	11.0	12.1	8.8	8.2	7.5	6.6	6.2	4.2	3.2
Missouri	23.7	33.5	36.9	36.5	32.1	26.9	27.5	23.4	23.6	17.9	18.2	17.5	16.2	16.4	17.0	14.6	13.1	12.3	13.0	10.7	9.8	9.3	7.5	6.3	5.5	5.0
Montana *	15.3	17.1	19.4	19.5	15.6	14.1	12.2	11.7	11.7	13.8	12.4	14.5	11.9	14.4	12.9	14.6	14.1	12.8	10.2	10.1	10.9	10.6	8.7	6.2	4.5	4.6
Nebraska *	8.1	9.0	11.8	11.4	11.3	8.7	7.4	8.1	6.4	6.9	7.2	6.5	7.9	7.1	6.7	5.9	5.5	4.8	5.4	5.0	3.6	3.2	3.9	3.9	2.8	2.3
Nevada	35.9	38.1	30.3	29.2	26.0	20.1	21.2	21.6	21.7	20.4	18.4	21.1	21.0	22.8	20.7	20.1	19.2	18.9	18.0	18.7	16.0	15.2	14.8	12.3	13.7	11.5
New Hampshire	21.6	32.7	36.0	32.3	30.3	32.0	35.8	37.0	39.0	34.3	26.2	15.1	13.4	15.3	11.8	12.5	9.4	13.8	11.2	10.7	9.6	9.5	8.7	6.1	3.4	4.3
New Jersey	20.2	28.3	31.6	32.4	32.1	31.7	33.1	30.0	23.2	16.3	14.0	14.5	13.7	11.3	9.8	3.0	8.0	8.4	9.7	9.4	6.8	8.3	9.3	8.1	7.5	6.5
New Mexico	37.1	48.9	50.3	51.6	39.0	30.2	26.7	24.8	25.2	25.3	27.3	22.6	24.7	26.3	23.8	22.0	26.7	23.4	21.8	20.1	16.9	19.7	16.1	14.4	15.1	15.0
New York *	21.3	31.1	31.4	28.7	25.4	18.2	18.4	19.4	18.0	13.6	11.3	11.3	10.4	9.7	7.8	8.0	8.5	8.6	8.6	4.8	4.3	5.0	4.8	5.6	4.0	5.0
North Carolina *	25.7	33.7	41.8	39.2	30.9	22.3	22.4	24.1	19.7	15.8	13.8	12.9	13.3	13.0	11.4	12.6	12.8	11.9	11.8	11.4	9.9	9.0	7.7	6.6	6.0	4.6
North Dakota *	14.8	16.4	19.8	17.2	15.6	11.4	10.2	9.2	10.6	8.6	6.3	2.8	3.1	NSD	3.4	4.4	7.4	4.8	NR	NR	NR	3.5	NR	NR	NR	NR
Ohio *	27.2	41.6	45.6	48.1	47.2	38.3	35.9	46.3	39.1	29.9	24.6	20.8	18.9	17.7	16.1	10.9	15.1	13.9	13.2	10.9	9.9	6.8	8.2	6.5	5.0	4.2
Oklahoma *	25.5	32.4	30.7	24.4	19.4	16.7	18.4	20.1	21.5	19.0	20.3	20.6	20.6	18.9	19.4	20.6	15.6	18.8	16.2	13.8	13.9	11.8	7.1	8.0	7.1	5.4
Oregon *	33.5	40.8	31.1	26.8	18.7	14.0	12.6	12.4	11.9	12.0	12.8	11.3	12.5	13.5	12.9	12.9	11.8	13.2	12.9	10.4	10.0	9.8	8.9	6.9	6.0	6.1
Pennsylvania	25.6	37.1	40.9	43.2	42.4	35.6	36.1	44.3	37.9	26.3	21.9	19.4	19.0	18.3	15.3	15.2	14.9	13.9	13.5	13.2	12.7	11.4	9.1	7.9	9.5	8.1
Rhode Island	28.0	37.5	38.1	41.7	38.2	29.5	30.1	31.0	30.8	28.2	23.4	22.4	18.2	17.7	15.5	14.8	17.3	12.4	16.4	14.3	9.8	13.7	9.3	10.2	7.0	5.5
South Carolina *	27.5	41.3	44.7	42.8	34.9	22.7	22.6	20.5	18.1	15.7	14.4	13.0	12.5	13.3	14.6	13.3	12.5	12.1	12.7	9.9	8.4	7.0	5.3	5.9	6.5	3.7
South Dakota	11.9	11.2	11.3	12.6	10.3	10.5	6.9	8.5	8.4	8.4	7.8	6.9	5.5	7.1	6.3	6.7	7.3	4.1	5.1	5.5	5.8	3.3	3.1	3.2	2.8	NR
Tennessee	35.2	52.3	56.0	56.6	45.6	31.2	27.5	26.6	24.5	22.2	19.5	18.1	17.6	17.2	16.9	15.2	14.8	15.8	16.0	14.5	12.8	11.3	8.5	7.3	6.9	6.1
Texas *	15.8	18.5	18.2	16.8	14.1	10.8	10.4	10.5	10.1	9.4	9.7	9.3	9.4	10.1	9.6	9.8	8.5	9.3	9.5	8.5	8.2	8.1	7.5	6.6	5.0	5.4
Utah *	20.3	21.4	19.8	21.1	20.5	18.9	21.2	22.3	22.4	23.4	22.4	22.1	23.1	19.5	16.9	19.1	19.0	21.3	19.1	19.3	16.3	16.1	14.0	10.4	10.4	10.6
Vermont *	33.6	42.3	45.9	42.3	32.9	23.8	26.6	23.2	22.2	16.7	13.9	15.1	10.9	12.9	9.7	8.3	10.9	10.8	12.2	8.5	8.0	10.2	7.5	7.1	5.8	4.7
Virginia *	17.6	28.5	28.8	30.5	26.6	18.3	17.1	17.9	16.7	12.4	11.7	10.2	8.9	9.7	6.8	8.5	9.0	8.9	8.0	7.5	7.3	7.2	6.8	6.2	5.6	5.0
Washington *	37.6	42.4	33.7	28.1	22.0	15.8	14.8	15.2	14.5	14.7	13.3	13.4	13.7	14.1	13.1	14.3	14.8	14.4	13.6	13.0	12.7	11.1	10.4	8.1	9.2	9.3
Washington, D.C. *	43.2	60.7	64.3	63.6	58.1	43.2	35.4	44.0	38.8	18.6	14.2	15.0	12.6	13.5	12.9	4.1	9.6	10.8	17.8	13.7	15.5	18.1	10.9	16.2	13.4	8.3
West Virginia *	48.9	81.9	80.9	90.9	81.4	52.8	51.5	57.8	52.0	41.5	35.5	32.2	32.0	36.3	28.9	12.4	25.7	22.4	20.4	10.5	18.8	15.1	12.9	11.5	6.2	4.1
Wisconsin	19.8	30.6	31.8	31.6	27.7	21.1	19.2	21.2	19.3	15.5	15.1	15.0	12.2	12.1	10.9	10.9	10.6	11.1	10.6	9.3	7.9	7.0	6.2	5.0	4.6	4.0
Wyoming	20.1	23.7	21.9	18.9	17.4	14.1	11.1	12.2	17.6	16.4	19.4	17.2	16.8	15.2	15.0	11.0	14.0	12.3	10.6	4.9	9.1	5.9	6.9	4.5	4.6	4.1

== Death counts by state over time ==
Overall US totals by year from CDC, followed by breakdown by state by year.

Overall US totals by year. CDC
	1999	2005	2014	2015	2016
Total	16,801	29,736	46,959	52,279	63,363

Overall US totals by year
	2017	2018	2019	2020	2021	2022
Total	69,927	67,113	70,319	91,375	106,249	107,941

Location links below are "Category:Health in LOCATION" links. See overall category.

Drug overdose death counts by state over time. CDC.
Location	1999	2005	2014	2015	2016	2017	2018	2019	2020	2021	2022
Alaska	46	79	124	122	128	147	110	132	160	260	254
Alabama	169	283	723	736	756	835	775	768	1,029	1,408	1,492
Arkansas	113	269	1,211	392	401	446	444	388	546	637	617
Arizona	511	794	356	1,274	1,382	1,532	1,670	1,907	2,550	2,730	2,664
California	2,662	3,214	4,521	4,659	4,654	4,868	5,348	6,198	8,908	10,901	10,952
Colorado	349	608	899	869	942	1,015	995	1,079	1,492	1,887	1,811
Connecticut	310	295	623	800	971	1,072	1,069	1,214	1,371	1,552	1,482
Delaware	50	62	189	198	282	338	401	435	444	513	549
Florida	997	2,371	2,634	3,228	4,728	5,088	4,698	5,268	7,231	7,827	7,551
Georgia	283	738	1,206	1,302	1,394	1,537	1,404	1,408	1,916	2,500	2,687
Hawaii	80	126	157	169	191	203	213	242	274	269	284
Iowa	53	141	264	309	314	341	287	352	432	475	469
Idaho	64	109	212	218	243	236	250	265	287	354	385
Illinois	825	1,067	1,705	1,835	2,411	2,778	2,722	2,790	3,549	3,762	3,849
Indiana	191	610	1,172	1,245	1,526	1,852	1,629	1,699	2,321	2,811	2,682
Kansas	89	241	332	329	313	333	345	403	490	680	754
Kentucky	197	638	1,077	1,273	1,419	1,566	1,315	1,380	2,083	2,381	2,271
Louisiana	188	661	777	861	996	1,108	1,140	1,267	1,896	2,463	2,376
Massachusetts	488	780	1,289	1,724	2,227	2,168	2,241	2,210	2,302	2,585	2,642
Maryland	629	656	1,070	1,285	2,044	2,247	2,324	2,369	2,771	2,737	2,573
Maine	67	163	216	269	353	424	345	371	496	611	707
Michigan	460	985	1,762	1,980	2,347	2,694	2,591	2,385	2,759	3,089	2,997
Minnesota	136	282	517	581	672	733	636	792	1,050	1,356	1,384
Missouri	276	608	1,067	1,066	1,371	1,367	1,610	1,583	1,875	2,155	2,192
Mississippi	87	248	336	351	352	354	310	394	586	787	758
Montana	41	96	125	138	119	119	125	143	162	199	208
North Carolina	366	1,000	1,358	1,567	1,956	2,414	2,259	2,266	3,146	3,981	4,310
North Dakota	12	12	43	61	77	68	70	82	114	124	148
Nebraska	39	86	125	126	120	152	138	161	214	214	225
New Hampshire	54	142	334	422	481	467	452	407	393	441	486
New Jersey	557	823	1,253	1,454	2,056	2,685	2,900	2,805	2,840	3,056	2,985
New Mexico	266	373	547	501	500	493	537	599	784	1,052	1,024
Nevada	227	457	545	619	665	676	688	647	832	949	1,003
New York	959	944	2,300	2,754	3,638	3,921	3,697	3,617	4,965	5,842	6,358
Ohio	467	1,243	2,744	3,310	4,329	5,111	3,980	4,251	5,204	5,397	5,144
Oklahoma	178	478	777	725	813	775	716	645	762	960	1,196
Oregon	210	386	522	505	506	530	547	615	803	1,171	1,363
Pennsylvania	990	1,613	2,732	3,264	4,627	5,388	4,415	4,377	5,168	5,449	5,169
Rhode Island	58	156	247	310	326	320	317	307	397	455	424
South Carolina	147	427	701	761	879	1,008	1,125	1,127	1,739	2,138	2,279
South Dakota	17	40	63	65	69	73	57	86	83	105	95
Tennessee	344	872	1,269	1,457	1,630	1,776	1,823	2,089	3,034	3,813	3,825
Texas	1,087	1,910	2,601	2,588	2,831	2,989	3,005	3,136	4,172	4,984	5,489
Utah	205	438	603	646	635	650	624	571	622	662	627
Virginia	366	581	980	1,039	1,405	1,507	1,448	1,547	2,240	2,626	2,496
Vermont	29	53	83	99	125	134	153	133	190	252	276
Washington	555	850	979	1,094	1,102	1,169	1,164	1,259	1,733	2,264	2,725
Washington, D.C.											451
Wisconsin	212	518	853	878	1,074	1,177	1,079	1,201	1,531	1,775	1,792
West Virginia	75	184	627	725	884	974	856	870	1,330	1,501	1,335
Wyoming	20	26	109	96	99	69	66	79	99	109	126

For convenience, and as a geographic aid, the "Category:Health in STATE" links are also in this map. Click on any state.

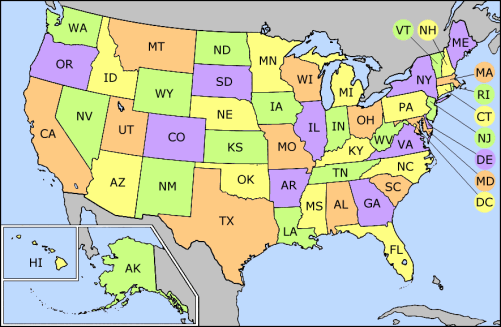

== Timeline by drug ==
Concerning the data in the charts below (in this section and the following sections) deaths from the various drugs add up to more than the yearly overdose death total because multiple drugs are involved in many of the deaths.

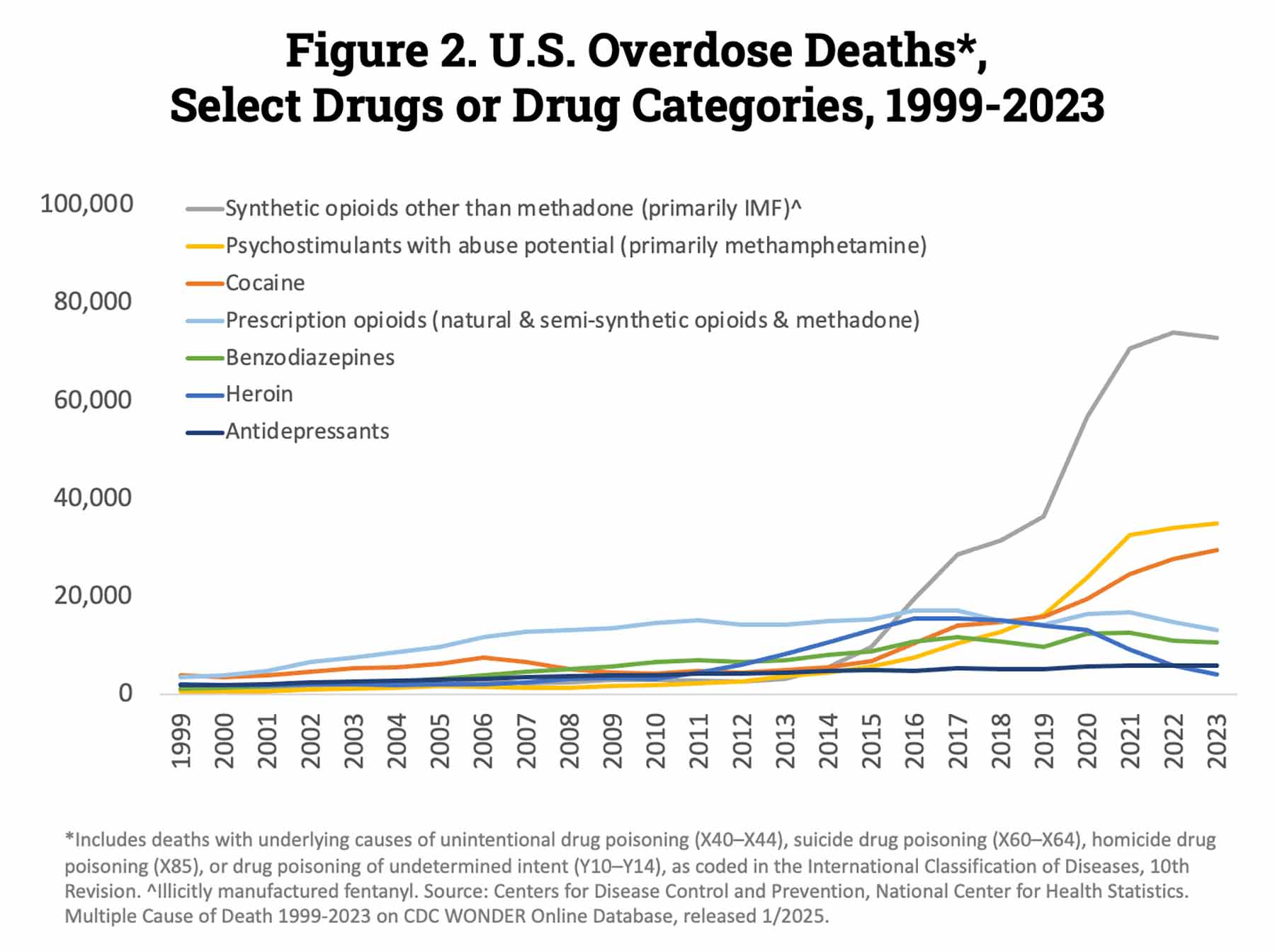
US yearly overdose deaths, and the drugs involved.

== Opioid charts ==
Opioids were involved in around 80,400 of the around 106,700 deaths in 2021. See map higher up for states with the highest overdose death rates.

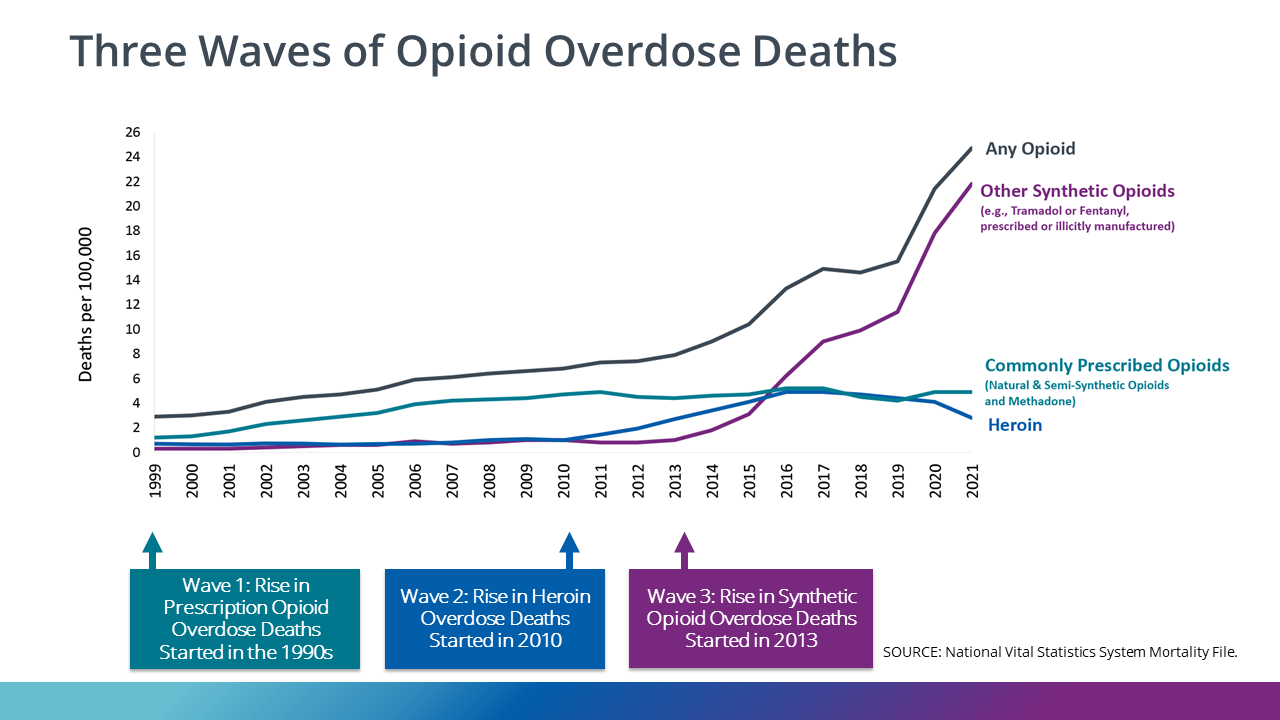
Three waves of opioid overdose deaths.

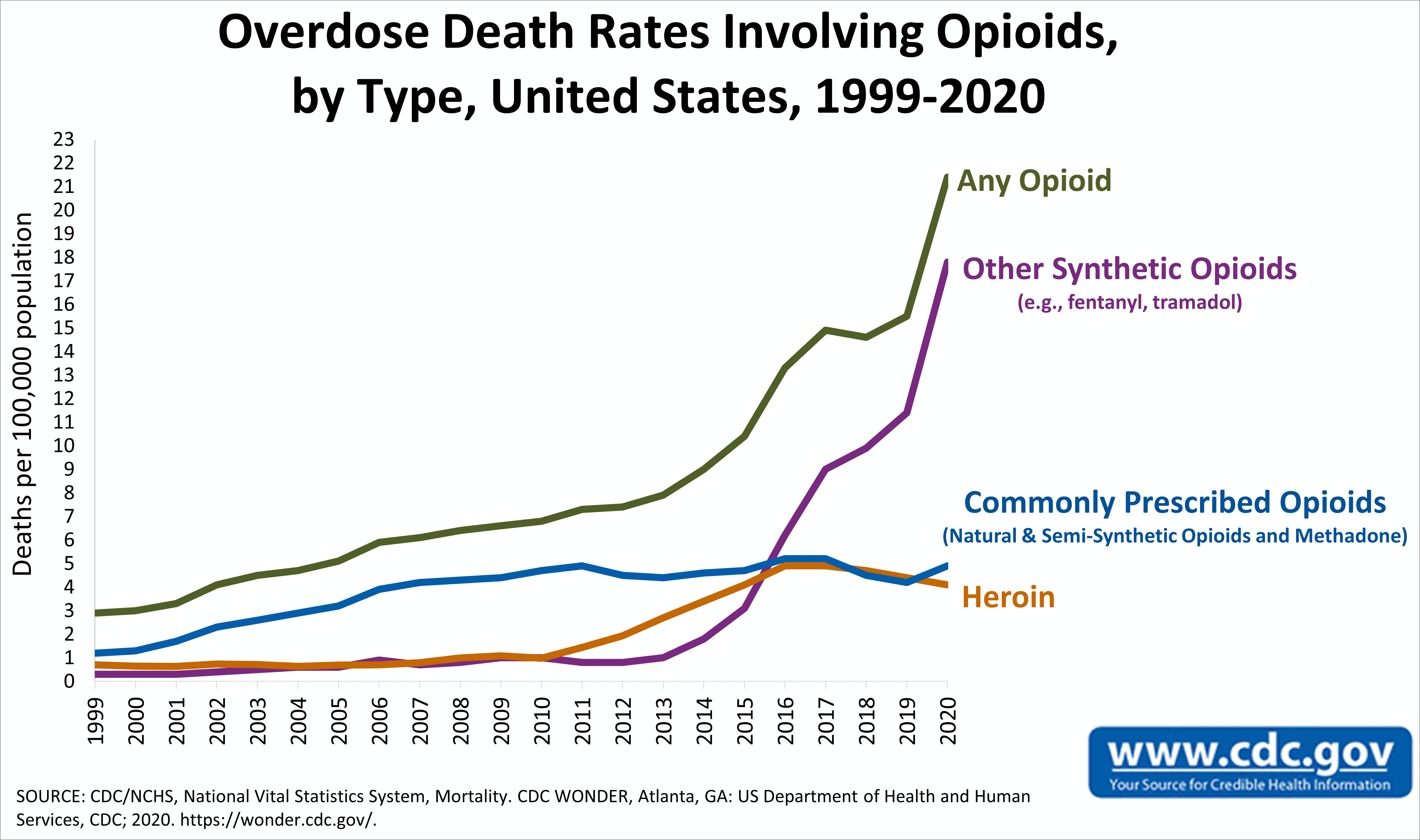
U.S. overdose deaths involving all opioids. Deaths per 100,000 population.

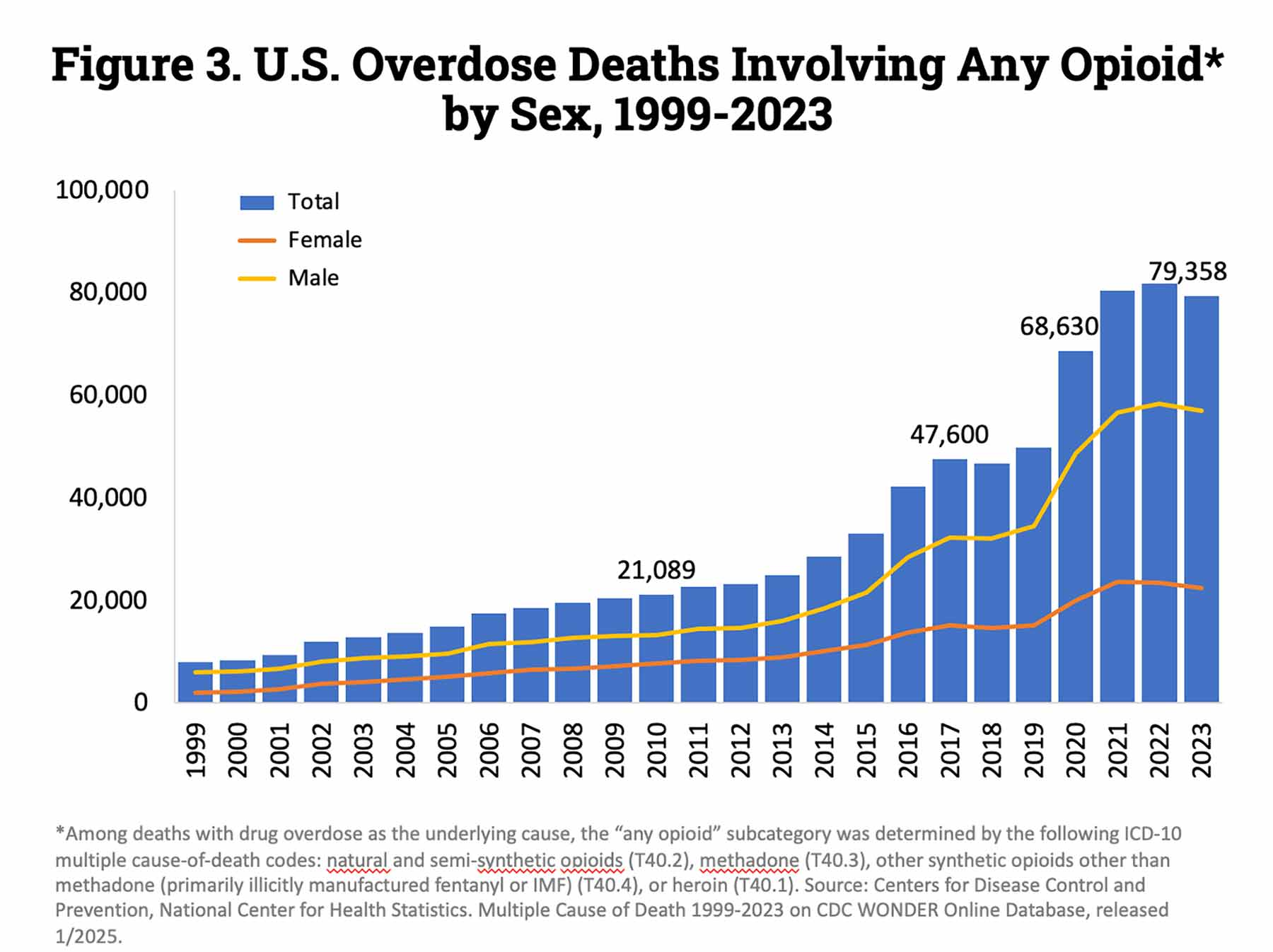
US yearly deaths from all opioid drugs. Included in this number are opioid analgesics, along with heroin and illicit synthetic opioids.

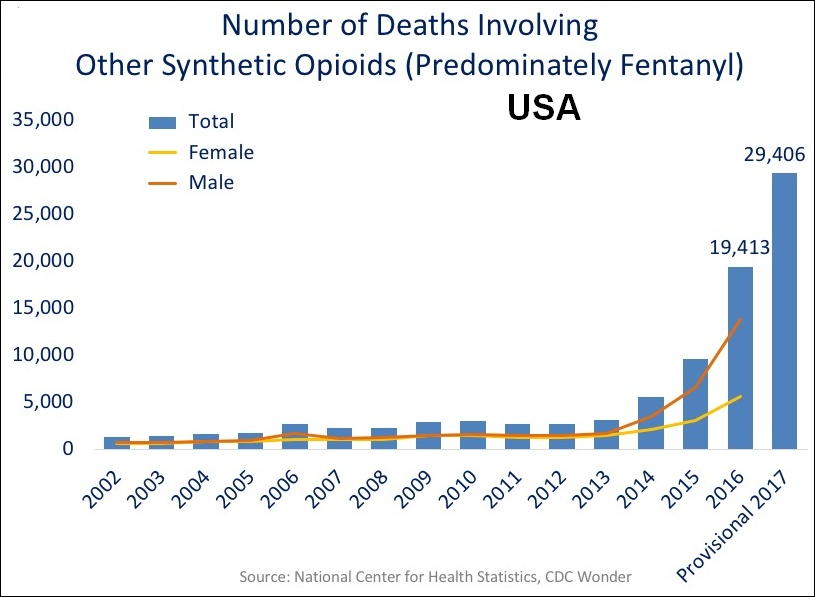
US yearly deaths involving other synthetic opioids, predominately Fentanyl.

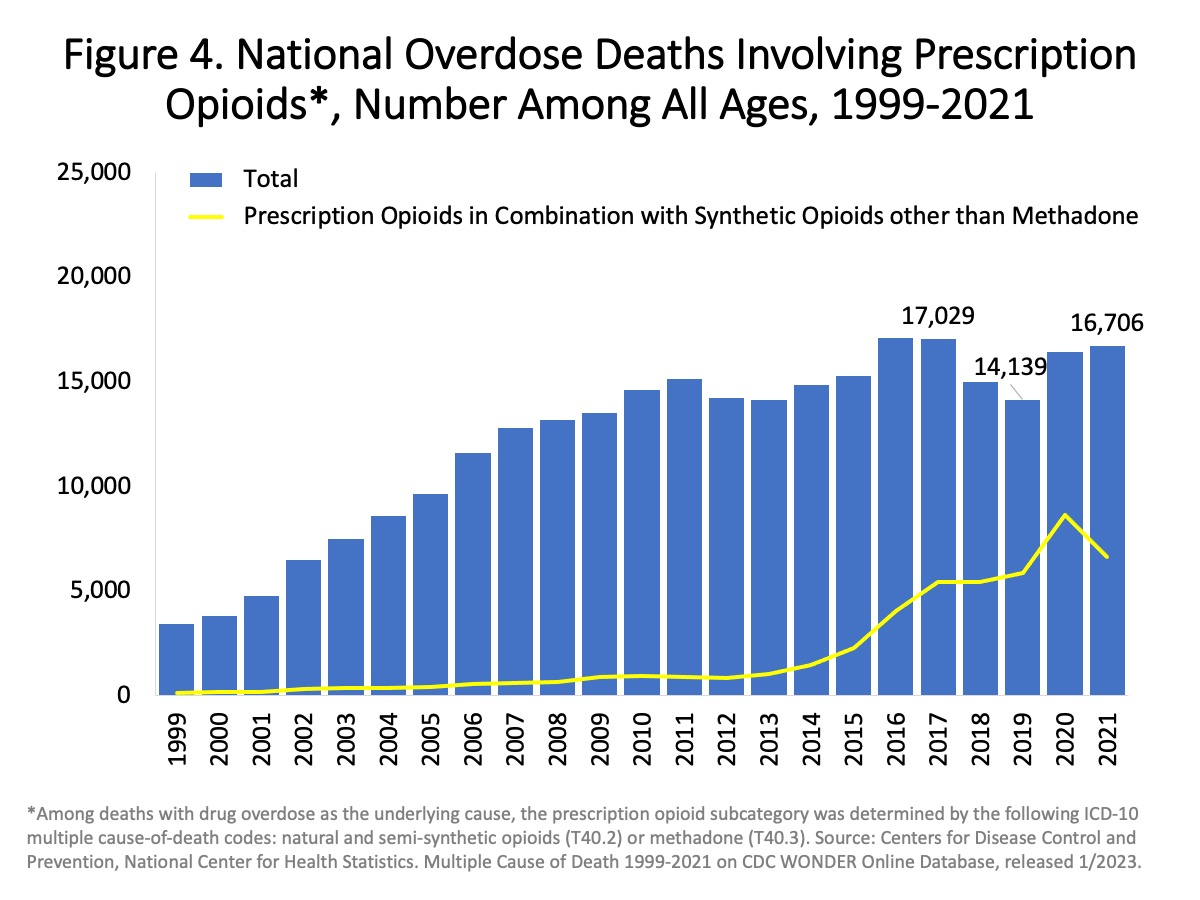
US yearly deaths involving prescription opioids. Non-methadone synthetics is a category dominated by illegally acquired fentanyl, and has been excluded.

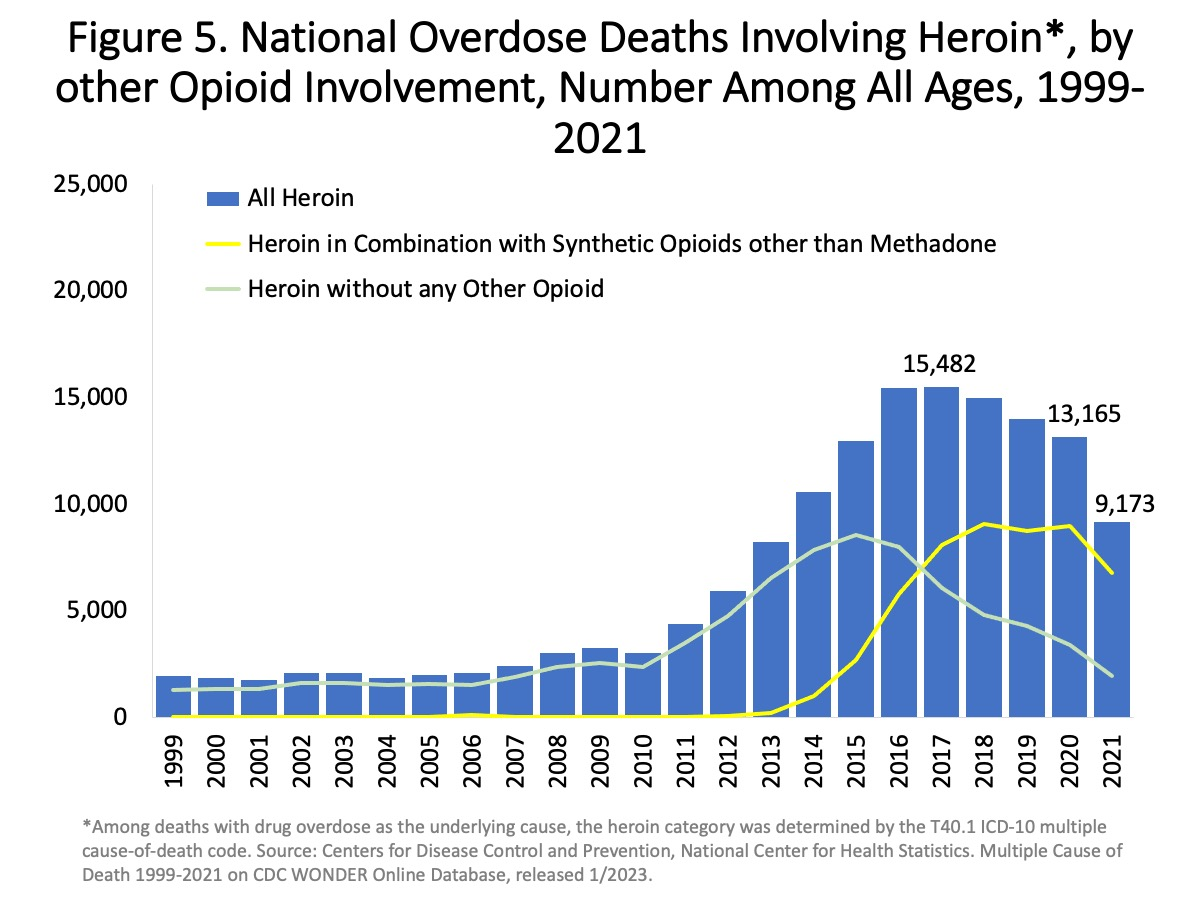
US overdose deaths involving heroin, by other opioid involvement.

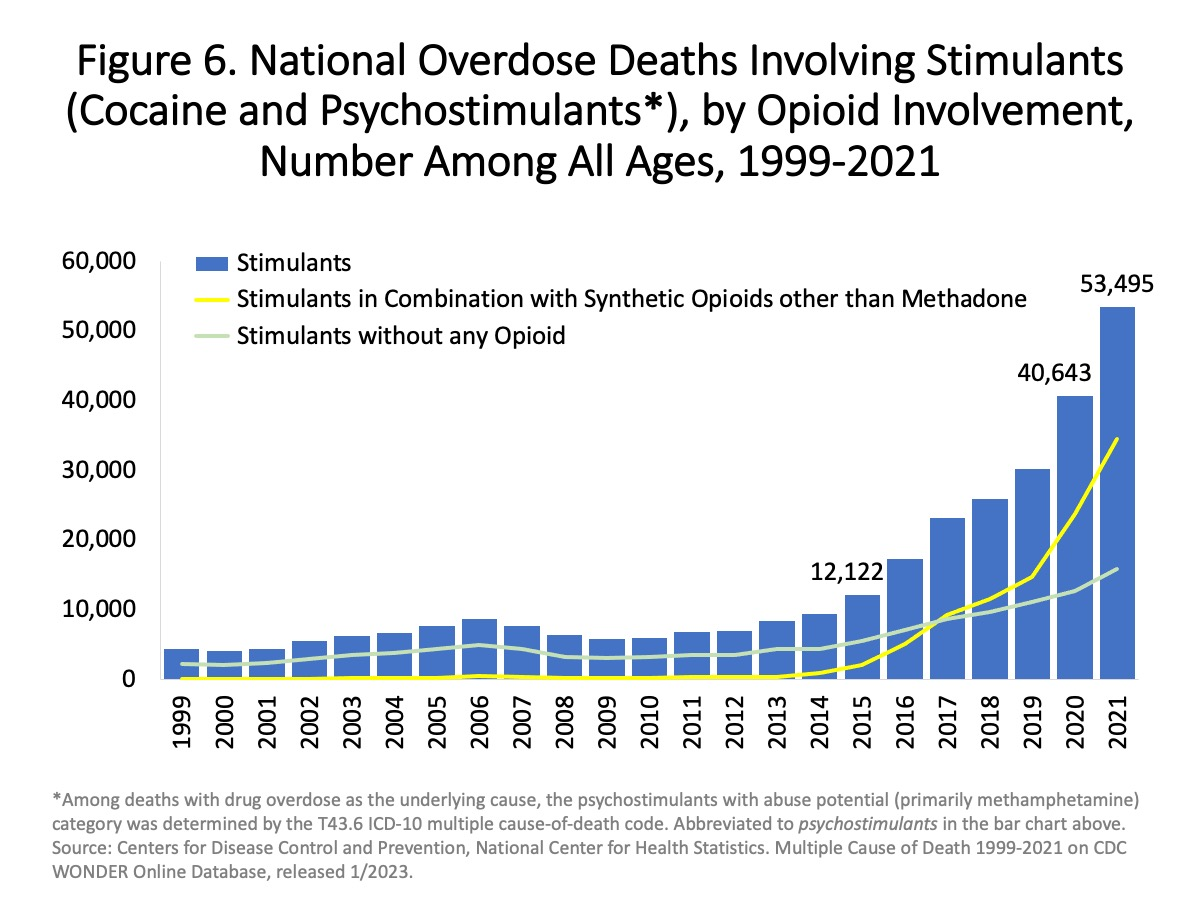
Timeline of US overdose deaths involving stimulants (cocaine and psychostimulants), by opioid involvement.

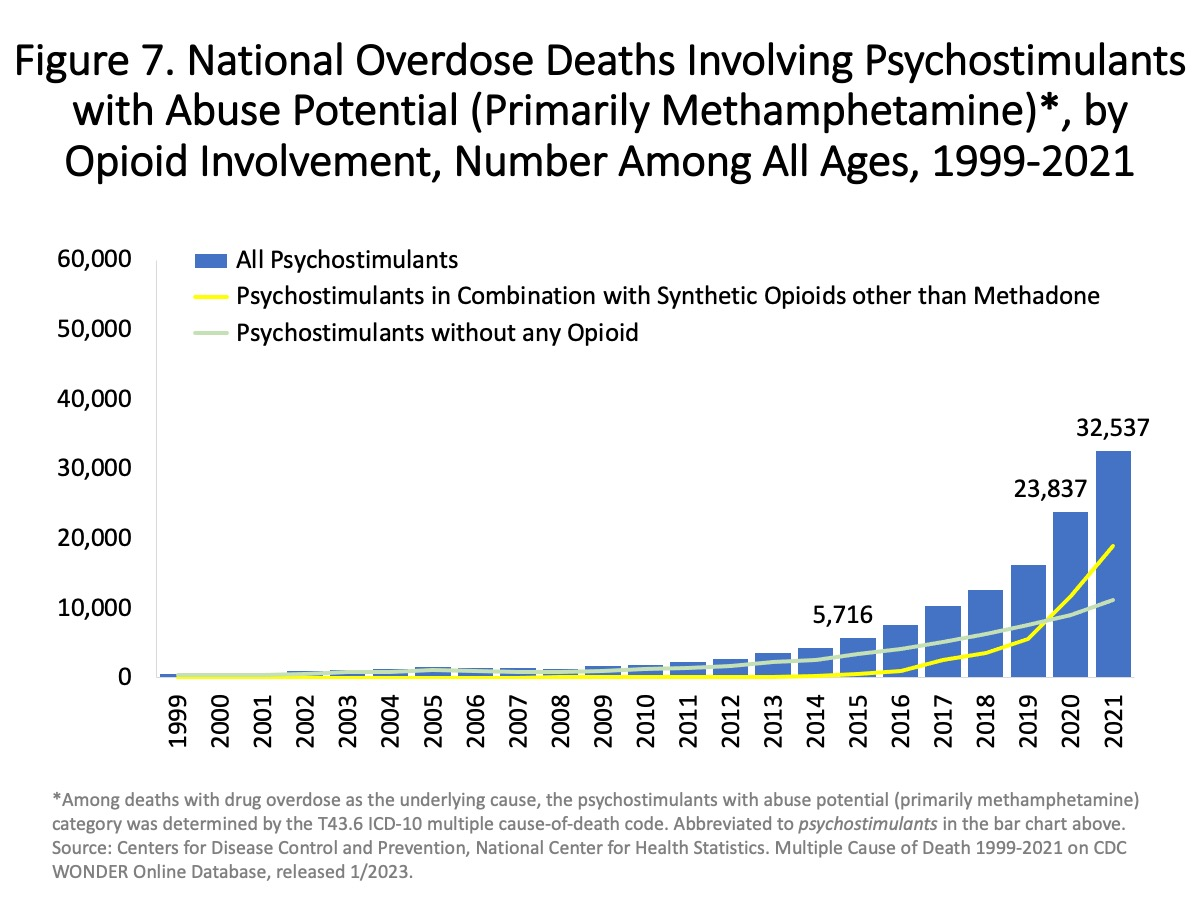
US overdose deaths involving psychostimulants with abuse potential (primarily methamphetamine), by opioid involvement.

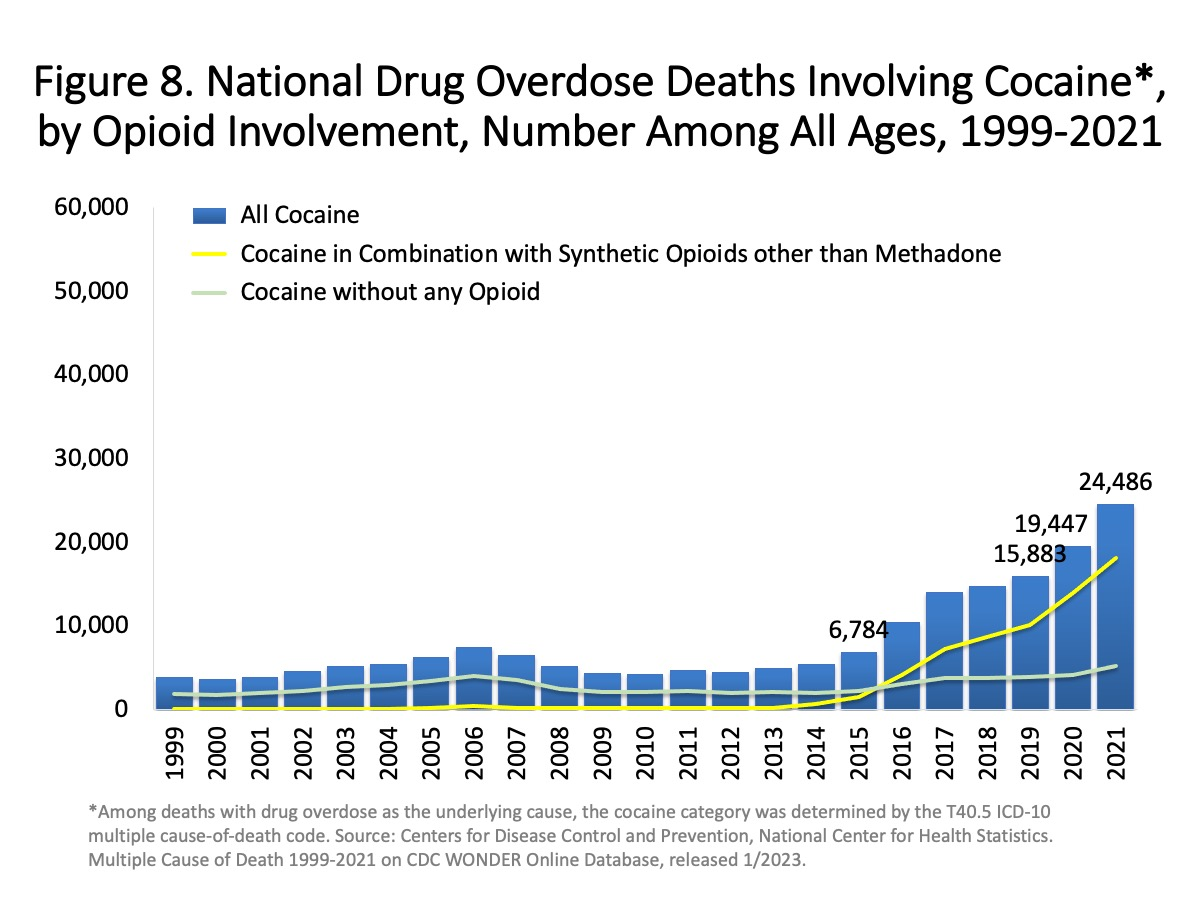
Opioid involvement in cocaine overdose deaths.

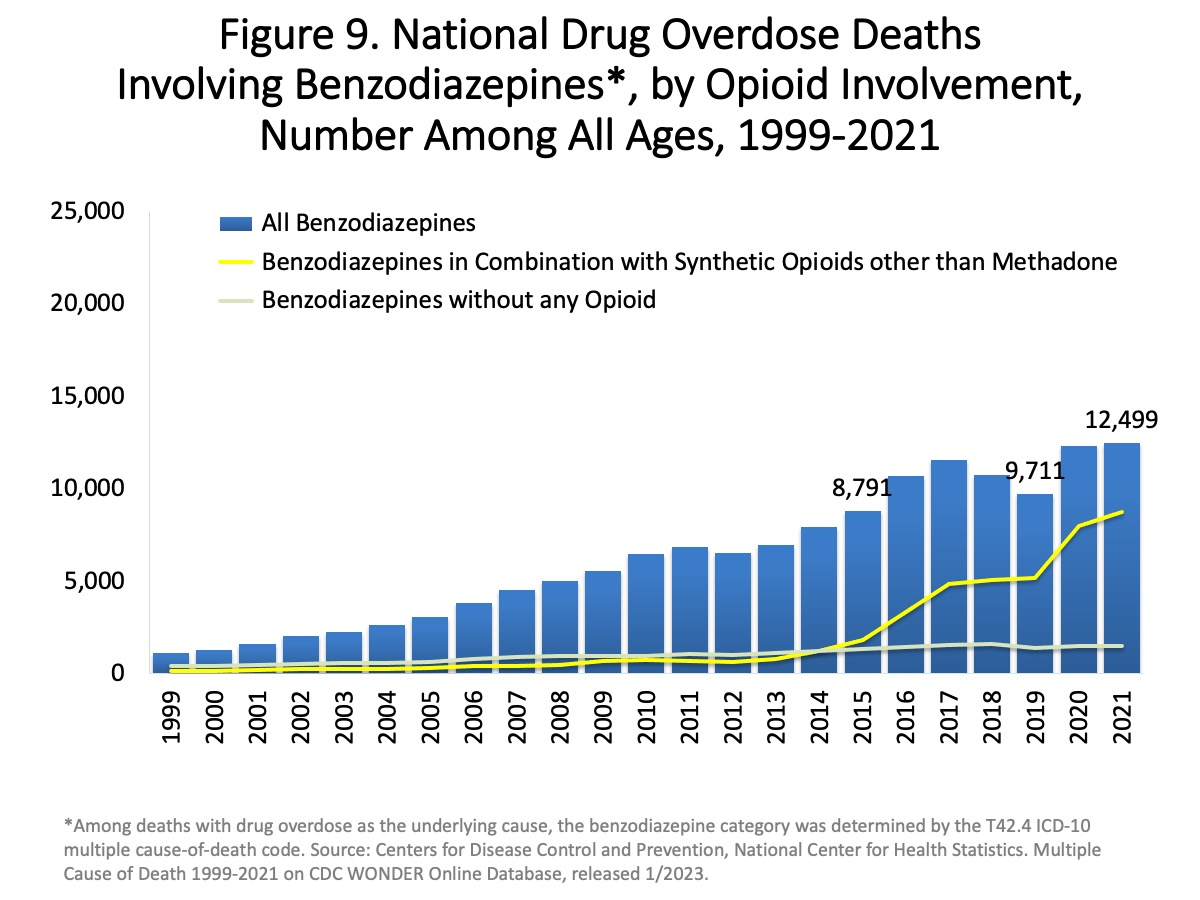
The top line represents the yearly number of benzodiazepine deaths that involved opioids in the US. The bottom line represents benzodiazepine deaths that did not involve opioids.

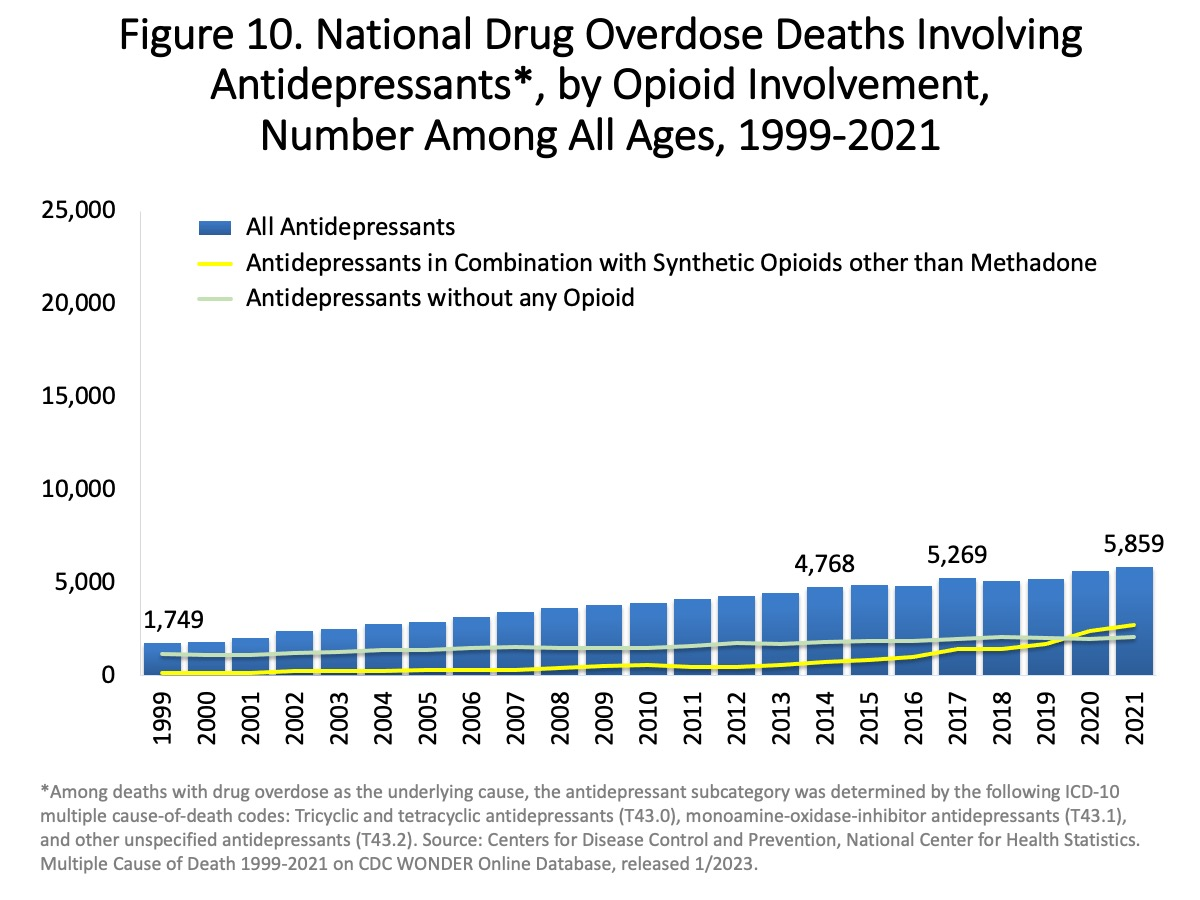
Drug overdose deaths involving antidepressants, by opioid involvement.

== Death rates by race and ethnicity ==
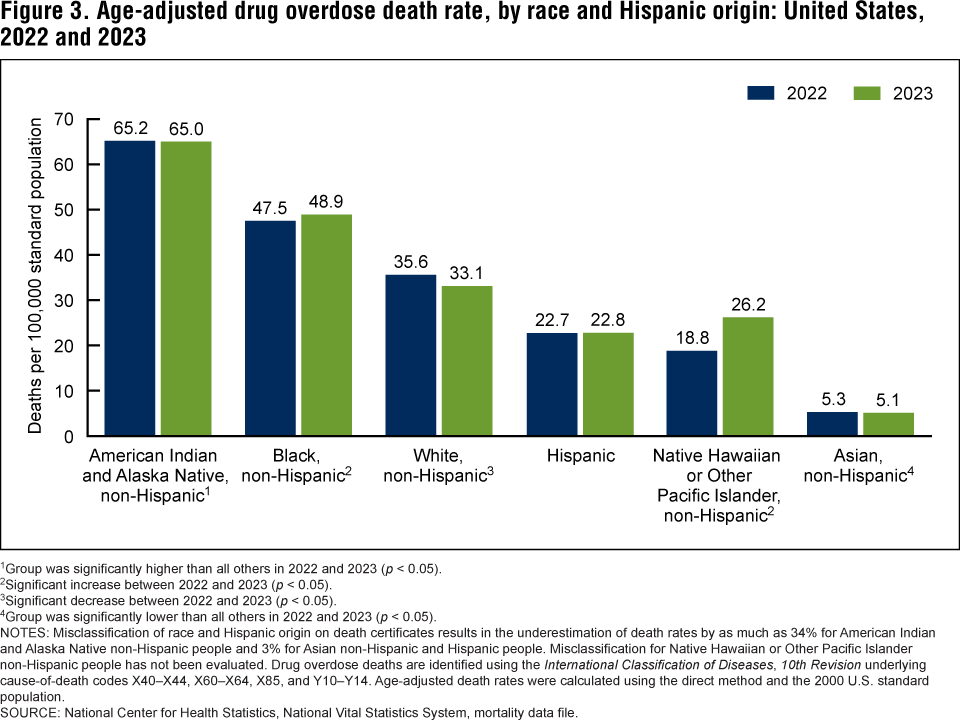
Age-adjusted drug overdose death rate, by race and Hispanic origin. United States, 2022 and 2023.

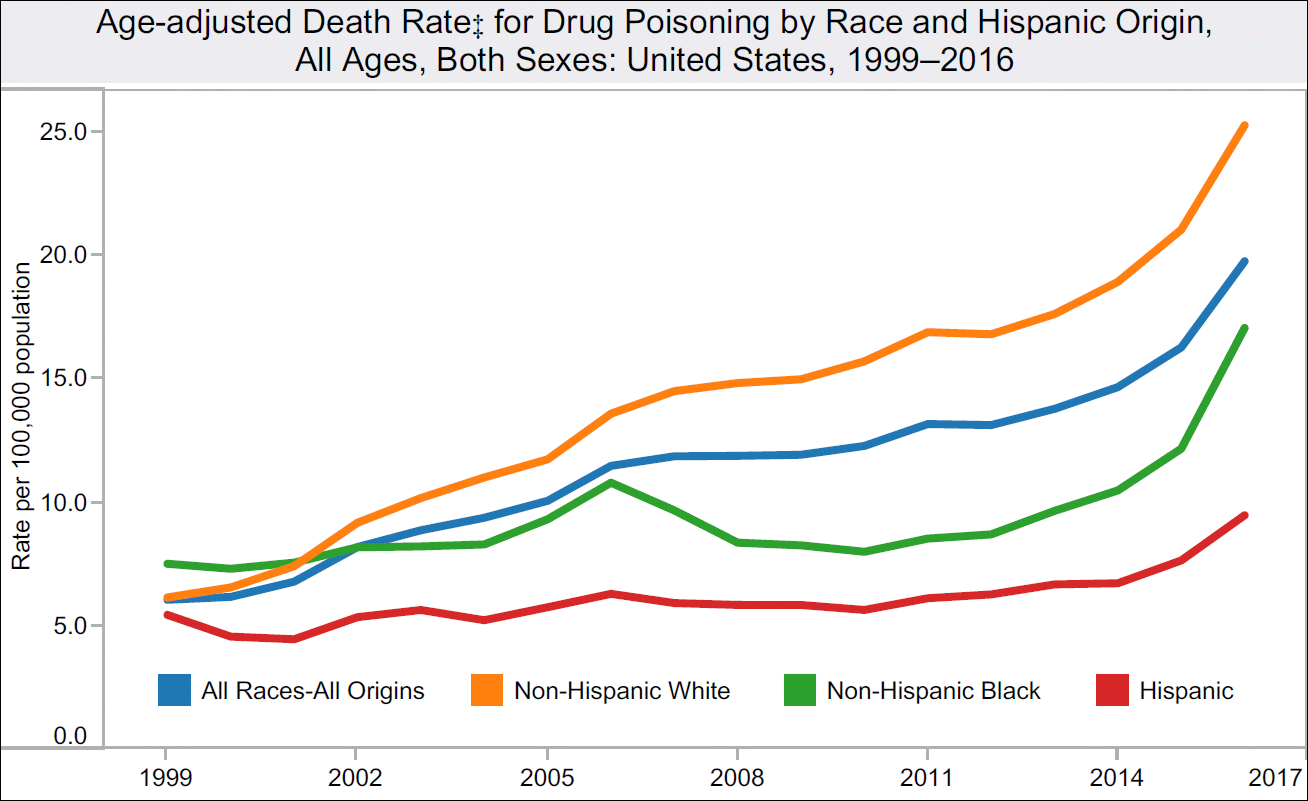
Timeline of US drug overdose death rates by race and ethnicity. Rate per 100,000 population.

== Rate timeline by sex ==
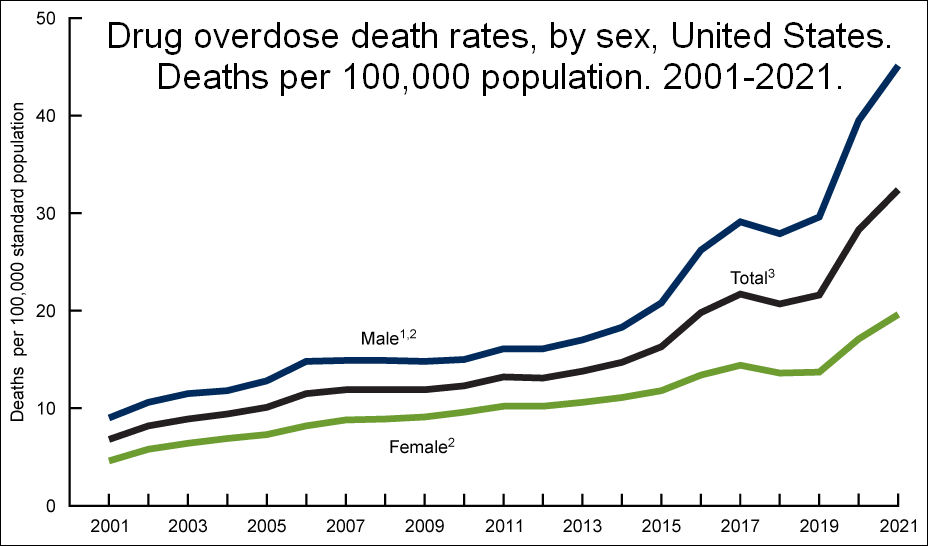
Timeline of US drug overdose death rates by sex. Rate per 100,000 population.

== Comparisons to other countries ==
Death rates from drug use by year. Source is more interactive.

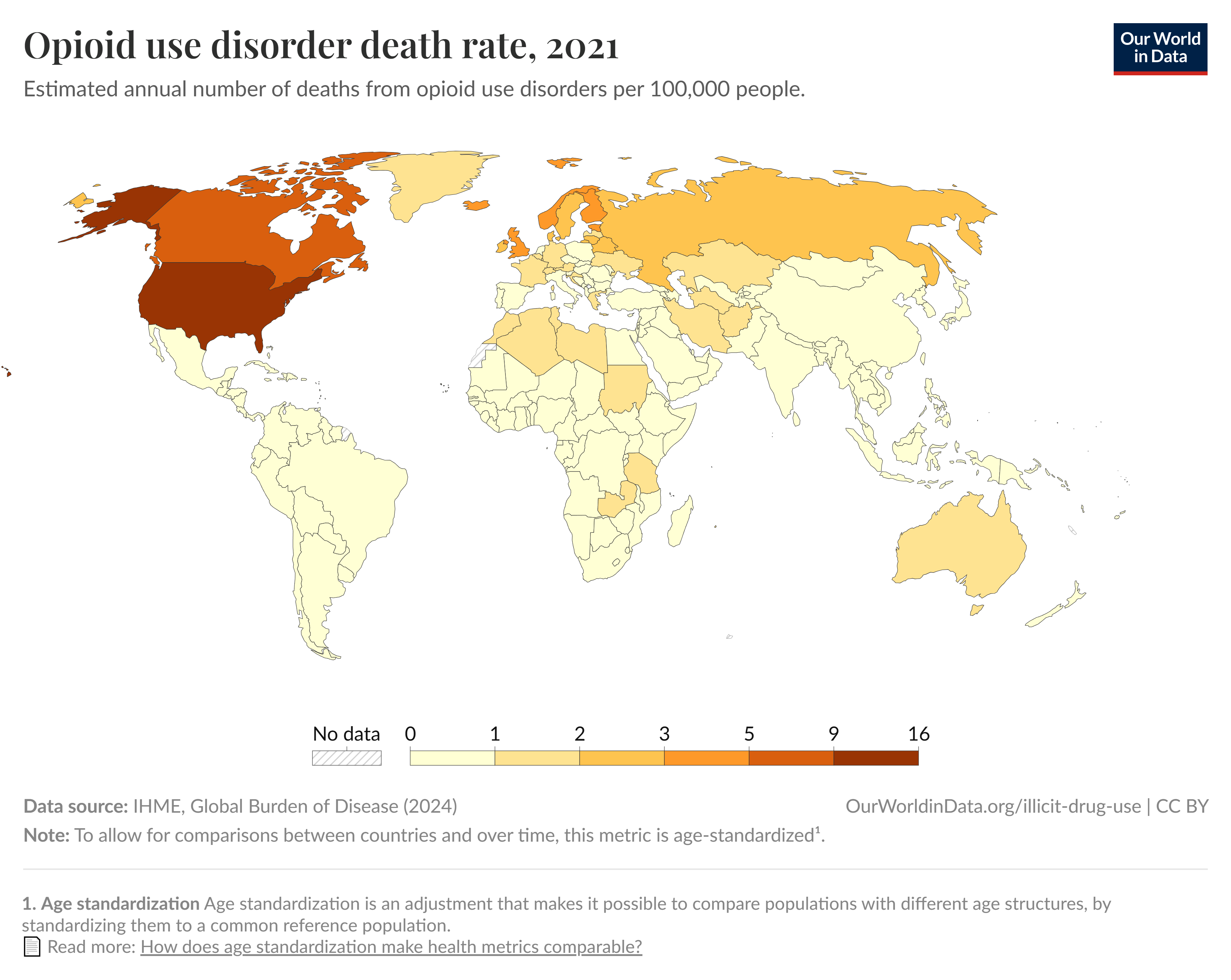
A world map showing each country's 'opioid use disorder' death rate in 2021, by how darkly the country is colored.

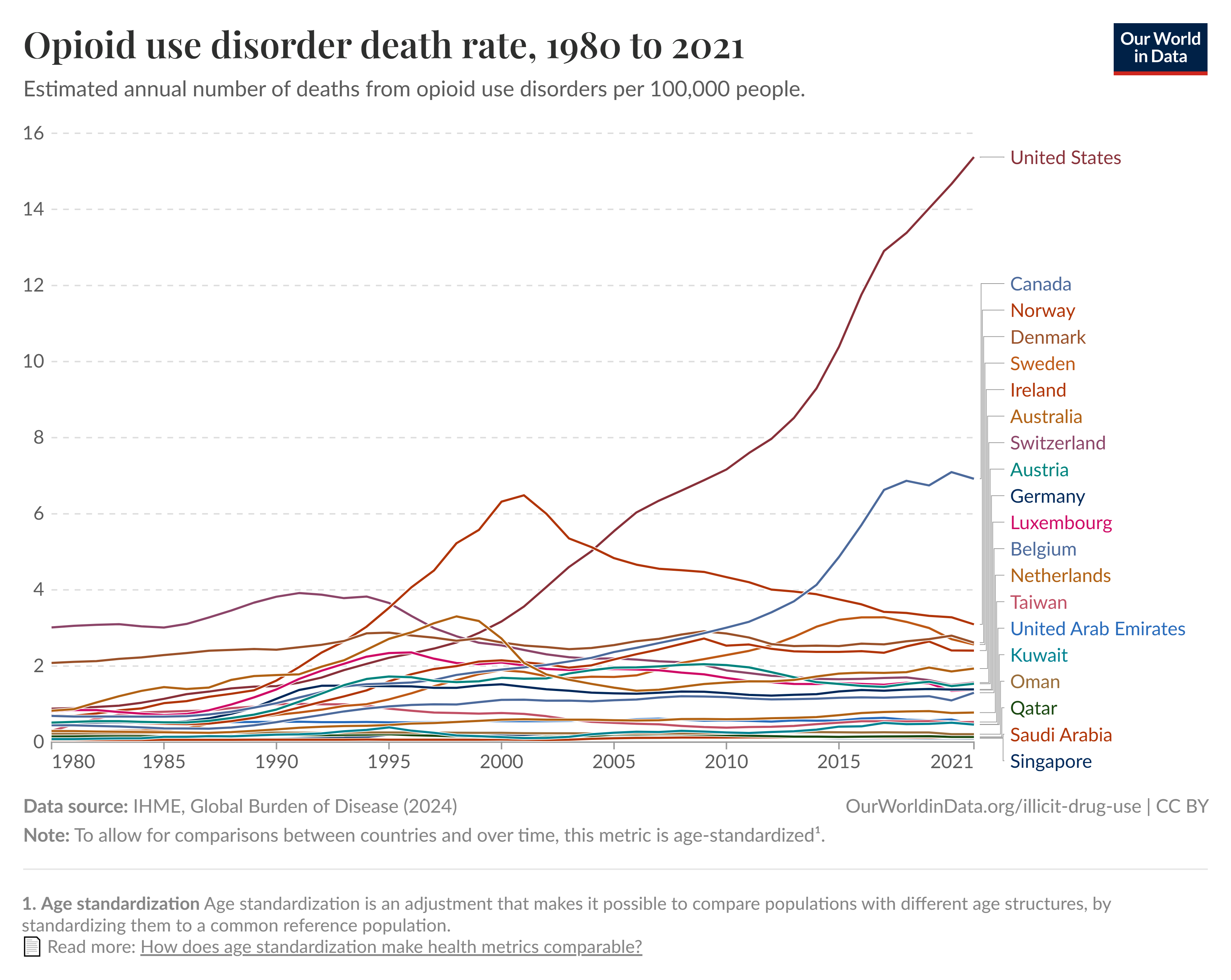
Opioid Use Disorder Death Rate, 1980-2021, of the 20 Countries with the Highest GDP per Capita.

Below is the overdose or drug-related death rate per 1 million population (unadjusted), 2022, by country or region.

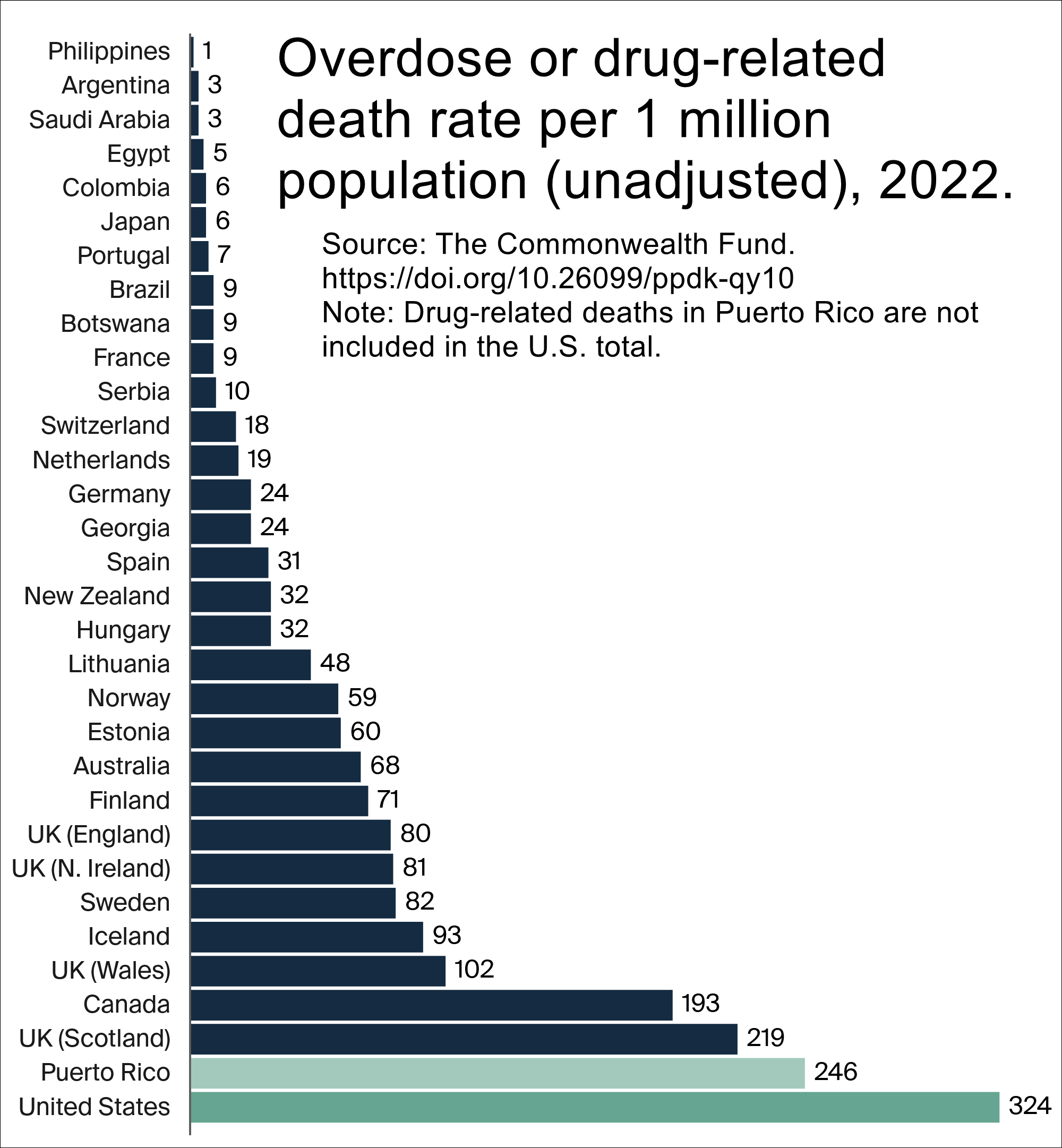

== Comparisons to other countries in Europe ==
=== Rates per 100,000 adults ===
- Location links are "Healthcare in LOCATION" links.

Drug-induced mortality rates in Europe per 100,000 among adults (15-64), females, males and total.
Location	Year	Females	Males	Total
Austria	2022	1.8	6.5	4.2
Belgium	2020	0.7	3.4	2.1
Bulgaria	2022	0.1	0.8	0.4
Croatia	2022	1.3	7.1	4.2
Cyprus	2022	0.3	1.3	0.8
Czech Republic	2022	0.6	1.2	0.9
Denmark	2021	1.9	6	4
Estonia	2022	3.4	15.5	9.5
Finland	2022	3.3	10.6	7
France	2016	0.3	1.6	0.9
Germany	2022	1	4.9	3
Greece	2020	1	5.8	3.4
Hungary	2021	0.3	0.9	0.6
Ireland	2020	6.4	13	9.7
Italy	2022	0.2	1.3	0.8
Latvia	2022	1.2	9.6	5.3
Lithuania	2022	1	8.6	4.7
Luxembourg	2022	0.5	3.1	1.8
Malta	2020	0.6	4.3	2.6
Netherlands	2022	1.3	4	2.6
Norway	2022	5.3	11.8	8.6
Poland	2021	0.5	1.1	0.8
Portugal	2021	0.4	1.9	1.1
Romania	2022	0.1	0.3	0.2
Slovakia	2021	0.3	1.2	0.7
Slovenia	2022	1.6	7.4	4.6
Spain	2021	0.7	3.4	2.1
Sweden	2022	3.5	10.2	7
Turkey	2022	0.1	0.7	0.4

=== Counts ===
- Location links are "Healthcare in LOCATION" links.

Drug overdose deaths in Europe per year by country.
Location	2022	2021	2020	2019	2018	2017
Austria	248	235	191	196	184	154
Belgium			172	168	152	148
Bulgaria	20	20	24	11	24	18
Croatia	102	77	99	97	85	65
Cyprus	5	10	6	5	12	16
Czech Republic	64	64	58	42	39	42
Denmark		184	199	203	183	239
Estonia	82	39	33	27	39	110
Finland	250	287	258	234	261	200
France						417
Germany	1,631	1,466	1,581	1,398	1,276	1,272
Greece			230	230	274	255
Hungary		42	48	43	33	33
Ireland			322	298	266	235
Italy	298	296	309	374	336	297
Latvia	63	17	21	12	20	22
Lithuania	87	62	47	52	59	83
Luxembourg	8	5	6	8	4	8
Malta		5	9	4	3	5
Netherlands	332	298	295	252	224	262
Norway	321	241	324	275	286	247
Poland		289	229	212	199	202
Portugal		81	63	72	55	51
Romania	27	30	33	45	26	32
Slovakia		28	37	34	32	19
Slovenia	66	65	70	74	59	47
Spain		820	774	546	450	437
Sweden	519	450	524	555	583	643
Turkey	246	270	314	342	657	941
United Kingdom						3,284

== See also ==
- List of deaths from drug overdose and intoxication
- Adulterants
- Alcohol intoxication
- Diseases of despair
- Drug interactions
- Responsible drug use
- Suicide methods § Drug overdose
