= IDPH =

IDPH may refer to:

- Illinois Department of Public Health
- Iowa Department of Public Health
