= Healthcare in Denmark =

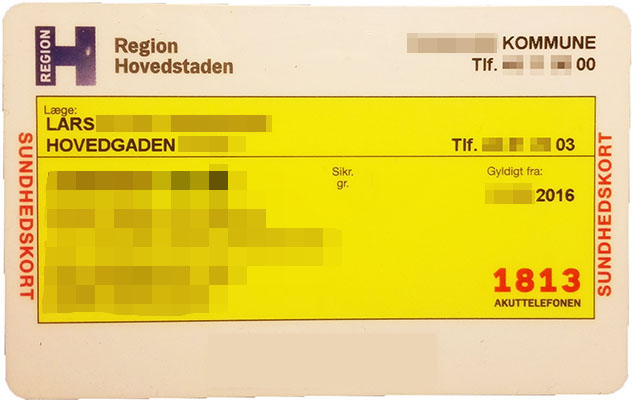
A Danish health care card, giving the holder access to the Danish public health care

Healthcare in Denmark is largely provided by the local governments of the five regions, with coordination and regulation by central government, while nursing homes, home care, and school health services are the responsibility of the 98 municipalities. Some specialised hospital services are managed centrally.

Danish government healthcare expenditures amount to approximately 10.4% of the GDP, of which around 84% is funded from regional and municipal taxation redistributed by the central government. Because necessary healthcare is taxpayer-funded, personal expenses are minimal and usually associated with copayments for certain services. Those expenses are usually covered by private health insurance.

Use of electronic health records is widespread, and efforts are underway to integrate these at the regional level.

For every 1,000 people in Denmark, there are about 3.4 doctors and 2.5 hospital beds. Spending on hospital facilities, at 43% of total health care spending, is above the average for OECD countries, even though the number of beds has decreased considerably. Child vaccination coverage is over 90%. Mortality from heart disease decreased in the years up to 2015, while life expectancy increased.

== Healthcare administration ==
=== Central government ===
The central government plays a relatively limited role in health care in Denmark. Its main functions are to regulate, coordinate and provide advice and its main responsibilities are to establish goals for national health policy, determining national health legislation, formulating regulation, promoting cooperation between different health care actors, providing guidelines for the health sector, providing health and healthcare-related information, promoting quality and tackling patient complaints.

In 1994, the Health Ministry created an agency that joined health care industry and providers to agree on systemwide software standards. The Danish Quality Model, based on the Institute for Quality and Accreditation in Healthcare was introduced in 2005 and run in cooperation between Danish Regions, the Ministry of Health, Health Protection Agency, KL, the Danish Pharmaceutical Association and the Danish Chamber of Commerce. In 2007, a reorganization gave general practitioners more duties while health care decision-making was centralized. In April 2015 it was announced by Health Minister Nick Haekkerup and President of Danish Regions Bent Hansen that it was to be abandoned. Hansen said "Quality work must be simplified and focused. The time has come to strengthen it by putting the patient at the centre, rather than focusing on compliance with a variety of standards. Accreditation has been justified and useful, but we move on. We need a few national targets to be met locally with strong commitment from the staff and with room for local solutions".

The financial stability law introduced in 2012 means that all regions and municipalities must keep within 1.5% of their budgets. The Central government must also now approve the introduction of new specialist facilities or the closure of existing facilities.

=== Local government ===
The 5 regions are responsible for hospitals and general practitioners. They are financed mainly through income taxes.

The 98 local communes have long had responsibilities for nursing homes and care services. Local political accountability to a population with a large proportion of elderly people means that these services get political attention. The level of satisfaction with the health system in 1997 was greater than in other EU countries, including some with larger health care expenditures per capita. In 1988, legislation a law was passed limiting the construction of new nursing homes and nursing homes were converted to single-occupancy rooms. From 1997 all new housing for older people was required to have at least a bedroom, sitting room, kitchen, and bath.

The Skaevinge Municipality set up an Integrated Home Care project in 1984 which was evaluated by the Danish Institute of Health Care in 1997. Health care was made available to all citizens both in institutions and in their own homes and prevention and support to maintain and strengthen their health and quality of life were prioritised. They were involved in decision-making and the staff, working in small teams were given more autonomy. It was found that in 1997 40.8% of older people assessed their own health as good in comparison with 28.9% people of the same age in 1985. The number of days people over 67 spent in hospital fell by 30%. The nursing home was closed and became a hub for community support services which included a senior center, day care, rehabilitation, 24-hour home care, and assisted living organised in three geographical teams. Nursing home staff were guaranteed jobs in the new set up. This integrated approach was widely adopted in Denmark. Nursing homes and home care organizations were no longer staffed separately. Between 1985 and 1997 the number of nursing home beds in Denmark was reduced by 30%.

=== Electronic health records ===
Denmark does not have nationwide electronic health records. It is mandatory for primary care practices and hospitals to use EHRs. The Danish Health Data Network (Medcom) acts as a data integrator to ensure interoperability. Unfortunately, non-interoperability is an issue despite the high adoption rate. The five regions are attempting to address this problem by each setting up their own electronic health record systems for public hospitals. However, all patient data will still be registered in the national e-journal.

== Healthcare costs ==
=== Public healthcare funding ===
In 2016, the Danish healthcare expenditure amounted to $5,205 U.S. dollars per capita (approximately 10.4 percent of GDP), with around 84.0 percent of healthcare expenditure being funded by governmental or compulsory means. Healthcare in Denmark is largely financed through local (regional and municipal) taxation with integrated funding and provision of health care at the regional level. The money is then disbursed to be used by the five administrative regions of local government according to the guidelines set by the central government.

=== Private healthcare funding ===
According to the OECD, in 2016 the private healthcare expenditure in Denmark was $831 U.S. dollars per capita (approximately 1.7 percent of GDP). The private healthcare insurance aids in covering a variety of copayments not fully covered by public healthcare funding.

== Services provided ==
=== Primary care ===
Citizens of Denmark may choose between two different types of health insurance groups, 1 and 2. Most are in group 1, which includes the majority of general practitioners, who are paid on a combined capitation and fee-for-service basis in a similar way to those in the United Kingdom. The regions determine the number and location of general practitioners, and their fees and working conditions are negotiated centrally between the physicians' union and the government. The municipal health services provide health visitors, home nurses and school health care. There is 1 doctor for every 294 persons in Denmark. Citizens are assigned a specific general practitioner (GP) and may receive aid at no cost, including visiting a medical specialist at the referral of their GP. More than 99 percent of patients are covered by the insurance from group 1.

Those who have the insurance provided by group 2 may visit any GP or medical specialist they wish, but may be subjected to copayments at their visit. Citizens with this type of insurance make up less than 1% of the population.

=== Secondary care ===
Hospital care is mainly provided by hospitals owned and run by the regions. This is similar to the model in other Scandinavian countries. Denmark has seen a decline in general acute care hospitals from 82 in 1997 to 52 in 2004. The number of hospital beds per 1000 people has also decreased from 4.64 in 1997 to 2.53 in 2015. According to the Danish Ministry of Health, the hospital sector is undergoing modernized restructuring by "merging specialised functions into fewer and larger units." Unlike standard hospital services, which are run by the regions within the country, these specialised hospital functions are overseen by The Danish Health Authority. Denmark is one of the highest spenders in the OECD of spending of hospitals per capita, accounting for around 43% of total health expenditure, significantly above the 35% average in the OECD. In Danish hospitals, nurses and doctors dispense the drugs, not pharmacies. Nurses and doctors are not blocked off from each other's jurisdiction; nurses may prescribe medicine in emergencies and explain later.

There are few private hospital providers, such as Danske Privathospitaler (DAPH), and they account for less than 1% of hospital beds.

== Performance of Danish healthcare ==
Life expectancy in Denmark

Denmark has made dramatic advances in the reduction of heart disease mortality according to the Euro health consumer index.

Life expectancy in Denmark has increased from 77.9 years in 2005 to 81.3 years in 2019. Danish women have a higher life expectancy (83.2 years in 2019) than Danish men (79.3 years in 2019).

=== eHealth ===
Denmark is one of the world's leaders in the use of health care technology. Virtually all primary care physicians have electronic medical records with full clinical functionality. Practitioners use Electronic Medical Records (EMR) and Electronic Prescribing to exchange clinical messages (EDI) using the MedCom network. Despite the high adoption levels, for several years Denmark has suffered from eHealth system fragmentation that has led to eHealth's inability to reach its full potential in delivering quality healthcare services.

The Region of Southern Denmark, North Denmark Region and Central Denmark Region have implemented modern and coherent EMR's with a number modules. The largest coherent EMR installation is in the Central Region of Denmark. The solution is delivered by the Danish company Systematic, and was centralized to be used in all 17 hospitals that have more than 20,000 users.

In an attempt to unify their fragmented e-health network, the Zealand regions will begin using a common EMR in 2016, Epic.

=== Psychiatric care ===
Due to the expanding ability to diagnose and treat psychiatric problems, Denmark has enhanced its treatment system for those dealing with a psychiatric issue. According to the Danish Ministry of Health, the number of patients who have received psychiatric hospital services has increased 28 percent from 2009 to 2014. Denmark has also had a decline in its suicide rate by 13% from 2009 to 2015.

=== Vaccinations ===
The National Childhood Vaccination Program in Denmark provides vaccinations to children for many diseases, including diphtheria, tetanus, and whooping Cough. From 1980 to 2015, vaccination coverage for those diseases increased from 88% to 93% of the children in Denmark, and the nation has consistently maintained 90% coverage or more since 2010. Those aged 65+ also receive the influenza vaccine. Denmark vaccinated 41.9% of the population aged 65 or above in 2015, a drastic increase from 6.2% in 2002. The cost of vaccinations is covered by the regions, with the exception of vaccinations required for vacation travel.
