= Bērnu Klīniskā Universitātes Slimnīca =

Hospital in Riga, Latvia

Geography
- Location: Vienības gat. 45, Zemgales priekšpilsēta, LV-1004, Riga, Latvia
- Coordinates: 56.922130°N 24.088044°E

Organisation
- Type: Specialist

Services
- Speciality: Children's hospital

History
- Opened: 1899 (Jugla District), 1981 (Tornakalns District)

Links
- Website: www.bkus.lv
- Lists: Hospitals in Latvia

Bērnu Klīniskā Universitātes Slimnīca (BKUS) is the only specialised children’s hospital in Riga, and is part of the University hospitals of Latvia. (English: Children's Clinical University Hospital)

== History ==
The city of Riga established a children's hospital in 1899 with funds provided by a wealthy industrialist, James Armitstead. This hospital was opened on October 2, 1899 with 116 beds. The Riga city 1st Children’s Clinic was opened on March 1, 1981 with 406 beds.

In 2022, there was a building programme which will replace the Emergency Medical Assistance and Observation Department. There will be 32 single wards with individual sanitary facilities, including two intensive therapy wards, two dangerous infection wards, ten infection wards, as well as specially suitable wards for patients with mental disorders, movement disorders, and autistic spectrum disorders. It will also have an Outpatient Health Center with almost 100 doctor reception, examination and procedure rooms.

== Services provided ==
It has about 30,000 inpatients episodes and more than 160,000 outpatient visits a year. From January to November 2019, 1,155 children were admitted with injuries due to swallowing foreign objects. There were 225 patients in the hospital's palliative care service in December 2019.

In 2019, it set up 7 digital check-in kiosks, with the Check-In, Flow Manager and Calling software to improve the flow of patients around the hospital services.
