= Health in Latvia =

Life expectancy in Latvia from 1896 to 2021

A new measure of expected human capital calculated for 195 countries from 1990 to 2016 and defined for each birth cohort as the expected years lived from age 20 to 64 years and adjusted for educational attainment, learning or education quality, and functional health status was published by The Lancet in September 2018. Latvia had the twenty-first highest level of expected human capital with 23 health, education, and learning-adjusted expected years lived between age 20 and 64 years.

As of 2009, there were approximately 8,600 inhabitants of Latvia living with HIV/AIDS, accounting for a 0.7% adult HIV prevalence rate. There were 32,376 (1.44%) individual instances of clinically reported alcoholism in Latvia in 2008, as well as cases of addictions to other substances. The annual number of births per 1,000 adolescent women aged 15 to 19 has declined from 49.9 in 1990 to 17.9 in 2007. In 2005, Latvia had a suicide rate of 24.5 per 100,000 inhabitants (down from 40.7 in 1995), the 7th highest in the world. Latvia achieved a remarkable improvement in infant mortality from 6.2/1000 births in 2012 to 3.9/1000 in 2014.

In 2018, the health among Latvian and international medical students studying in Riga was assessed. Latvian students displayed a higher prevalence of anxiety, depressive symptoms and physical symptoms. Latvian students displayed troubles adjusting to stressful life events. Further research to identify whether Latvians have a lower threshold for stressors or whether they are exposed to more stressors than international students should be performed. These stressors could be influenced by the growing social inequality within Latvia.

== Healthcare ==
The Latvian healthcare system is a universal programme, largely funded through government taxation. It is similar to British NHS-type health system with a purchaser-provider split (PPS). After undergoing multiple reforms, a National Health Service (NHS) (Nacionālais veselības dienests (NVD)) type system was established in 2011.

The NVD controls the implementation of healthcare policies while the Ministry of Health develops policies and oversees the system. Healthcare services are available for free for citizens of Latvia. The country's Ministry of Health manages its healthcare system through a combination of social insurance institutional body, legislative healthcare provision financed by taxes and numerous public and private providers.

Despite near-universal population coverage provided by the NVD established in 2011, there are challenges to equitable access with issues around geographical distribution of health professionals, user charges and long waiting lists. The publicly funded health benefits package is limited in scope and only covers a predetermined set of services.

Healthcare system of Latvia was among the lowest-ranked healthcare systems in Europe, due to excessive waiting times for treatment, insufficient access to the latest medicines, and other factors. There were 59 hospitals in Latvia in 2009, down from 94 in 2007, and 121 in 2006. In 2023, there are

Since 2012 performance has improved considerably, with a reduction in infant mortality from 6.2 per thousand births to 3.9 in two years.

Corruption is relatively widespread in the Latvian healthcare system, although the situation has improved since the early 1990s. It has been noted that an environment conducive to corruption has been promulgated by low salaries and poorly implemented systemic reforms. This also results in brain drain, mostly to Western EU nations. According to the survey conducted by the Euro health consumer index in 2015 Latvia was among the European countries in which unofficial payments to doctors were reported most commonly.

== Vaccination ==
Individuals have the right to decline mandatory vaccinations. Health care providers must obtain the signatures of decliners and explain the health consequences; other countries do not have similar requirements.

Mandatory vaccines are publicly funded; these include tuberculosis, diphtheria, measles, hepatitis B, human papilloma virus for 12-year-old girls, and tick-borne encephalitis until age 18 in endemic areas and for orphans. Other vaccines are not publicly funded.

== Health statistics ==
Access to health care in Latvia remains limited for a large segment of the population, with large numbers of those on low incomes, reporting unmet needs (above 12%) because of financial constraints, and those with high income are closer to EU average 2.5%.

In OECD statistics only 46% of Latvians reported to be in good health, the second lowest level in the EU by 2015, and the health expenditure per capita ranked 27 out of 30 countries in EU while also being the second lowest after Romania, with the second lowest life expectancy among all EU countries in 2017.

In Euro Health Consumer Index, which ranks performance of accessibility, outcome, prevention and pharmaceuticals scores, Latvia ranked in 30th out of 35 countries in overall ranking in 2018. According to OECD Country Health Profile 2019, Leading causes of deaths (approx. 3/4) are cardiovascular diseases, cancer, stroke and heart attack related. In recent years mortality from cancers (prostate, pancreatic, breast) are rising.

Latvia ranked second lowest after Lithuania, between other EU countries in including preventable causes of mortality, and third lowest, after Lithuania and Romania in terms of treatable causes of mortality.

The number of new HIV cases has been rising since 2005 and now is the highest in the EU. In 2017, 19/100 000 population in compared with 5.8/100 000 in the EU.

Latvia had the fourth highest mortality in Europe, at 704 per 100,000 population in 2015, the third highest rate of male smokers - 49%, and the second highest rate of death from injury (55 per 100,000).

=== Risk factors ===
The majority of deaths in Latvia can be linked to lifestyle-related risk factors, such as dietary risks (Latvia - 31%, EU - 18%), tobacco usage, alcohol and low physical activity.

According to OECD Country Health Profile 2017, in 2014, 1 in 4 adults in Latvia were daily smokers. About 1 in 5 adults reported heavy alcohol consumption on a regular basis, which was close to average in the EU, but with substantial difference between men (33%) and women (8%).

Obesity rates are the second highest in the EU and on the rise: more than 1 in 5 adults in Latvia was obese in 2014 compared to 1 in 6 in 2008.

In 2017, more than 21% of adults were obese, more than 6% above EU average.

== See also ==
- Health in Lithuania
- List of hospitals in Latvia.
