= Iowa Department of Health and Human Services =

Agency in the US state of Iowa

Agency overview
- Formed: 1937
- Jurisdiction: Government of Iowa
- Headquarters: Des Moines, Iowa, U.S.
- Agency executive: Larry Johnson, Director

The Iowa Department of Health and Human Services is a state agency of Iowa that provides services relating to the health and well-being of Iowans.

== History ==
The Iowa Board of Social Welfare was founded in 1937 by the Iowa General Assembly. In 1967, it was merged with the Iowa Board of Control and Iowa Board of Parole to form the Iowa Department of Social Services. It was renamed the Iowa Department of Human Services in 1983. In 2022, as part of Governor Reynold's State Agency Alignment initiative, the Iowa Department of Human Services and the Iowa Department of Public Health merged to form the Iowa Department of Health and Human Services.

== Functions ==
The agency provides human services, including healthcare services, assistance services, food programs, and disaster relief. The department also allows residents of Iowa to report incidents of fraud or abuse. The department also manages juvenile justice facilities and training schools in the state. The department also operates the Child Support Recovery Unit.

After the 2021 Fall of Kabul and subsequent formation of the Islamic Emirate of Afghanistan, the department was tasked with coordinating resettlement efforts for Afghan refugees.
