= Health in Nebraska =

The life expectancy of the U.S. state of Nebraska was 77.8 years in 2021. Heart disease kills the most people in the state.

== Diseases ==
=== Cancer ===
Cancer is the second-leading cause of death in Nebraska. Nebraska has the highest rate of pediatric cancer of states further west than Pennsylvania.

Areas with high nitrate levels in the water, like along the Platte and other rivers, correlate with higher occurrences correlate with increased rates of pediatric brain cancer, leukemia, and lymphoma.

=== Diabetes ===
Diabetes is the eighth-leading cause of death in Nebraska. In 2016, it killed 501 people in the state. Roughly 8% of the population is impacted by diabetes in the state. Diabetes is more prevalent among lower educated and lower income groups.

=== Obesity ===
Of adult Nebraskans, 36.6% report as having a body mass index of over 30 in 2023. The American Indian and Hispanic population experiences an elevated rate of obesity in the state. Adults aged 45–64 also see higher rates of obesity.

=== Sexually transmitted diseases ===
Per 100,000 people, there are 457.2, 177.5, and 5.4 cases of chlamydia, gonorrhea, and syphilis in Nebraska in 2020.

== Mental health ==
In February 2021, 33.8% of Nebraskan adults reported that they suffered from symptoms of depression or anxiety. Suicide is the tenth-leading cause of death in Nebraska. Most Nebraskan counties, 88 of 93, have a shortage of mental health professionals.

In 2022, 24,000, or 15%, of children in Nebraska had one major depressive episode throughout the previous year. As of 2025, a large youth mental health facility is in the process of construction in Omaha.

== Alcohol consumption ==
In 2023, 19.9% of Nebraskan adults reported heavy or binge drinking.

From 2010 to 2022, a declining number of Nebraskans aged 19–25 reported drinking alcohol. Also, fewer Nebraskans in that age group drove under the influence in 2022 compared to 2010. Hispanic young adults do not consume as much alcohol as their non-Hispanic counterparts, with 45.1% and 59.9% reporting it respectfully.

== Insurance ==
In February 2021, 7.9% of the state's populace was uninsured.

In May 2025, insurance providers were mandated to cover colorectal cancer screenings.

== See also ==
- Abortion in Nebraska
- COVID-19 pandemic in Nebraska
- Food insecurity and hunger in the United States
- Health in the United States
  - Health in Iowa
