= Danske Privathospitaler =

Geography
- Location: rg Alle 14, 2920 Charlottenlund, Denmark
- Coordinates: 55.764633°N 12.593846°E

Links
- Website: www.phdanmark.dk
- Lists: Hospitals in Denmark

Danske Privathospitaler is a private Danish hospital. It was created out of mergers with Esbjerg Privathospital, Frederiksborg klinikken and Privathospitalet Dalgas on 1 January 2007.

Danske Privathospitaler is the first private hospital to become national in Denmark.
