= List of hospitals in Latvia =

This is a list of hospitals in Latvia.

Hospitals in Riga:

- Bērnu Klīniskā Universitātes Slimnīca (Children's Clinical University Hospital)
- Pauls Stradiņš Clinical University Hospital
- Riga East Clinical University Hospital
- Hospital of Traumatology and Orthopedics
- "Šmerlis" Independent Hospital
- Riga City Maternity Hospital
- Bikur Holim Hospital (Riga), old and respected Jewish hospital, recently re-opened in the former ghetto outside Old Riga.
- Jūrmala Hospital
- Daugavpils Regional Hospital
- Liepāja Regional Hospital
- Rēzekne Hospital
- Vidzeme Hospital
- North Kurzeme Regional Hospital - Ventspils, Latvia
