= Health in Iowa =

The life expectancy of the U.S. state of Iowa was 77.7 years in 2021. Heart disease kills the most people in the state. The state is also afflicted with high levels of obesity, diabetes, and cancer, costing Iowa billions of dollars per year. Iowa's health is highlighted by its rural and agricultural nature, affecting several aspects of lifestyle in the state, and thereby health. Iowa has high levels of alcoholism among Midwestern states and the nation as a whole. According to the Iowa Department of Health and Human Services, there are around 30,000 deaths in Iowa per year.

== Facilities ==
The University of Iowa manages medical facilities in Iowa City. The U.S. News & World Report ranks it as first among Iowan hospitals. The University of Iowa Division of Student Wellness has a program that helps students to recover from substance abuse.

Iowa has a significant number of rural medical facilities. The One Big Beautiful Bill Act cut funding of rural medical facilities down to 43% of what National Public Radio found necessary.

== Diseases ==
=== Alcoholism ===
Iowa ranks fourth in the nation for binge drinking, with 22% of civilians reporting doing it. Binge drinking is more prevalent among Iowan men than with women, with 29% and 14% reporting it, respectively. Axios states that the colder climate, college culture, rural culture, and the state's high rate of people of German or Scandinavian ancestry are reasons why Iowa has a higher rate of drinking.

Iowa does not have a law warning of the risk of consuming alcohol during pregnancy.

=== Cancer ===
As of 2025, Iowa is one of two states that has an increasing rate of cancer. It also has an increasing survivorship of the disease. Overall, Iowa has the second highest prevalence of cancer among states. In addition, Iowa has the fifth-highest prevalence of melanoma in the nation. Cancer is the second most common cause of death in the state. In 2017, cancer accounted for 21.1% of deaths in Iowa.

Different types of cancer have various levels of prevalence across different areas of the state. Melanoma is most prevalent in the north due to the agricultural industry forcing workers outside more. Nitrate contamination from the agriculture industry in rivers has also been associated with an increase in cancer rates within the state. As of 2026, nitrate rates in rivers had doubled in the previous five decades. Lung cancer is more common in southern Iowa, where smoking is more prevalent. Prostate cancer is more common in northwest Iowa. Breast cancer is most common in the urban areas of the state. Alcohol-related cancers are also prevalent in the state due to Iowans drinking more than contemporaries from other states. Roughly 22% of the population reported binge drinking. The state has the highest rate of alcohol-related cancer cases in the Midwest.

Sexual and gender minorities (SGM) of the state may be more hesitant to seek screening for fear of discrimination. Inversely, medical providers are more likely to focus on their SGM patients, overlooking other characteristics of the patient.

=== Diabetes ===
The rate of diabetes in Iowa usually hovers from 8.8–9.7% among adults. Iowa's diabetes prevalence is typically lower than the median in the United States. Another 34% has prediabetes. In total, expenses from diabetes costed the state $2 billion in 2017. In 2017, diabetes accounted for 3.0% of deaths in Iowa.

The Better Choices, Better Health program aims at supporting adults with chronic conditions like diabetes.

=== Obesity ===
The rate of obesity in Iowa is increasing. Around 37% of the population of Iowa is obese. This ranks Iowa eleventh in the nation for the prevalence of obesity. Youth obesity for those aged six to seventeen stands around 15%. Iowa ranks fifteenth in youth obesity among states.

Pick a Better Snack and the 5210 program are two regiments implemented by the Iowa Department of Health and Human Services aimed at combating youth obesity.

=== Sexually transmitted diseases ===
Iowa mandates that both the diagnosing laboratory and clinician report data related to sexually transmitted diseases (STDs) to the state. In the state as a whole in 2020, per 100,000 people, there were 478, 219, 15.8 reports of chlamydia, gonorrhea, and syphilis, respectfully.

Polk County has higher rates of STDs per 100,000 people compared to the rest of the state. It reported 687, 414, and 35.9 instances of chlamydia, gonorrhea, and syphilis, respectfully, per 100,000 people in 2020.

== Mental health ==
Around 42% of adults in Iowa had symptoms of anxiety or depression in February 2021. In 2021, over a third of Iowan youth reported having symptoms of depression. Among LGBTQ youth, around two-thirds reported having depressive thoughts and 55% reported having suicidal thoughts. Roughly 84,000 Iowans live with severe mental illness. Mental health issues may be exacerbated by food insecurity in the state. As of 2024, Iowa has the fewest psychiatric beds per people in the United States, at roughly two beds per 100,000 people.

Iowans are twice as likely to be forced out-of-coverage for their insurance to seek aid for mental health. Suicide is the second-leading cause of death for those aged 5–44 in Iowa. In 2017, suicide accounted for 1.6% of deaths in Iowa.

Iowa runs a behavioral health service system under the Iowa Health and Human Services as dictated by House File 2673. The system aimed to rectify significant decentralization in mental health care in Iowa. It is run by the Des Moines-based Iowa Primary Care Association.

== Food security ==
In 2024, 11% of Iowans and 15.4% of children experienced food insecurity in the state. Of households receiving SNAP benefits, 40.7% have children. According to State Medical Director Robert Kruse, people who live in rural regions may not have as much access to higher-quality food sources, like supermarkets, instead relying on gas stations or fast food restaurants. Poor diet can lead to depression and obesity. Iowa also imports 90% of its food, increasing the cost of food. The Iowa Department of Agriculture and Land Stewardship runs a program, Choose Iowa, to promote consuming in-state foods.

== Insurance ==
Around 4.7% of Iowans were uninsured in 2021. Iowans are twice as likely to be forced out-of-coverage to seek aid for mental health. As a result of the Affordable Care Act, monopolization of health insurance increased rapidly.

On May 1, 2024, Governor of Iowa Kim Reynolds signed two laws regarding insurance, House File 2489 and House File 2668. The former mandates insurers to cover breast examinations and the latter requires them to cover biomarker testing.

== See also ==
- Abortion in Iowa
- COVID-19 pandemic in Iowa
- Food insecurity and hunger in the United States
- Health in the United States
  - Health in Nebraska
