= Healthcare in Luxembourg =

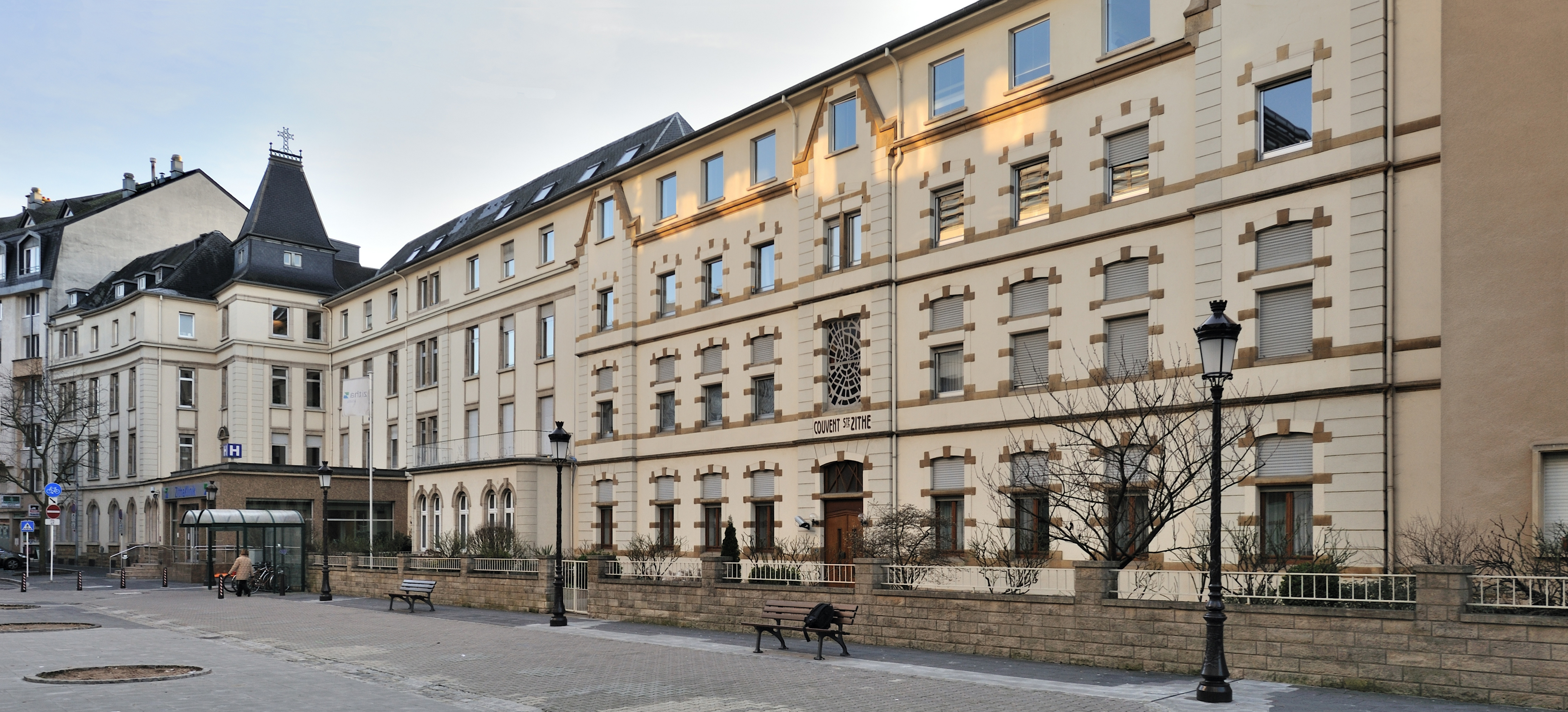
14 Hospitals like the Luxembourg City St. Zita Convent facility provide a wide range of healthcare services for Luxembourg's citizens.

Healthcare in Luxembourg is based on three fundamental principles: compulsory health insurance, free choice of healthcare provider for patients and compulsory compliance of providers in the set fixed costs for the services rendered. Citizens are covered by a healthcare system that provides medical, maternity and illness benefits and, for the elderly, attendance benefits. The extent of the coverage varies depending on the occupation of the individual. Those employed or receiving social security have full insurance coverage, and the self-employed and tradesmen are provided with both medical benefits and attendance benefits. That is all funded by taxes on citizens' incomes, payrolls and wages. However, the government covers the funding for maternity benefits as well as any other sector that needs additional funding. About 75% of the population purchases a complementary healthcare plan. About 99% of the people are covered under the state healthcare system.

== Funding Luxembourg's health system ==
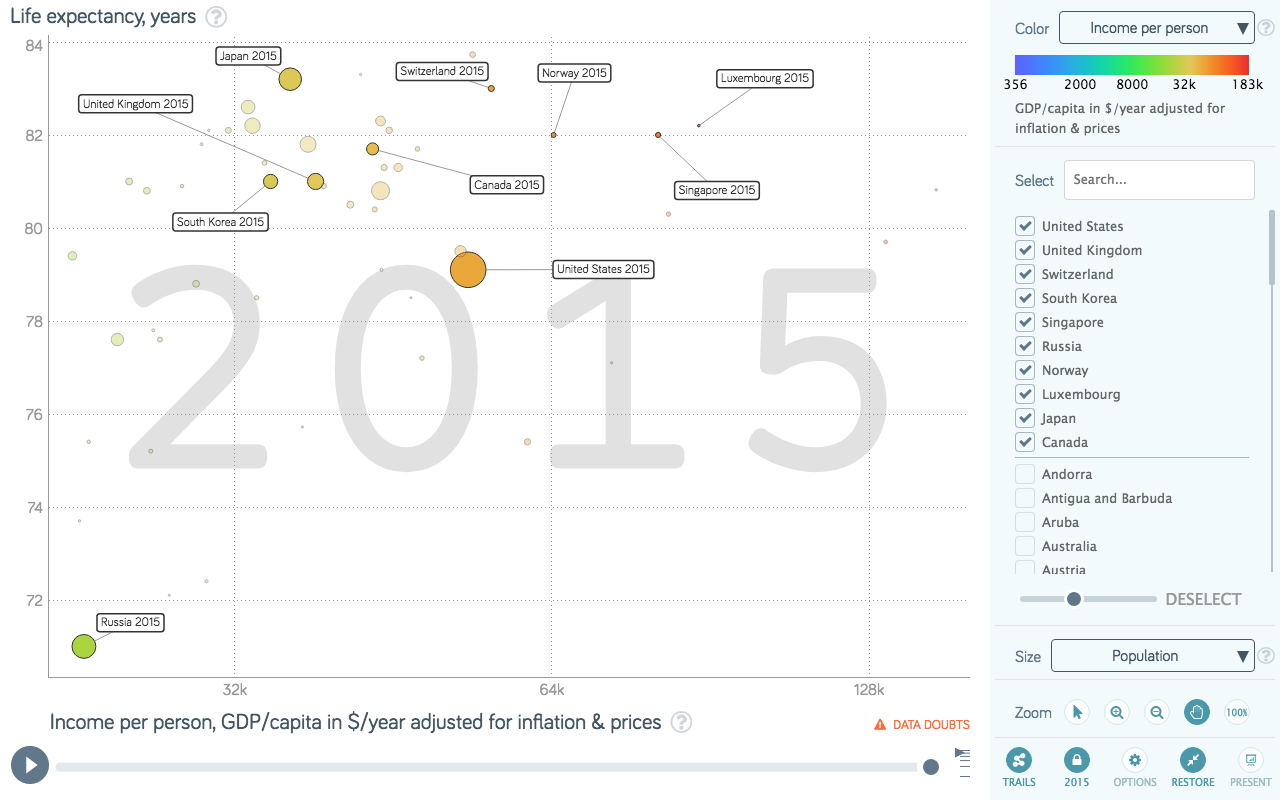
Income per person vs life expectancy for some countries in 2015

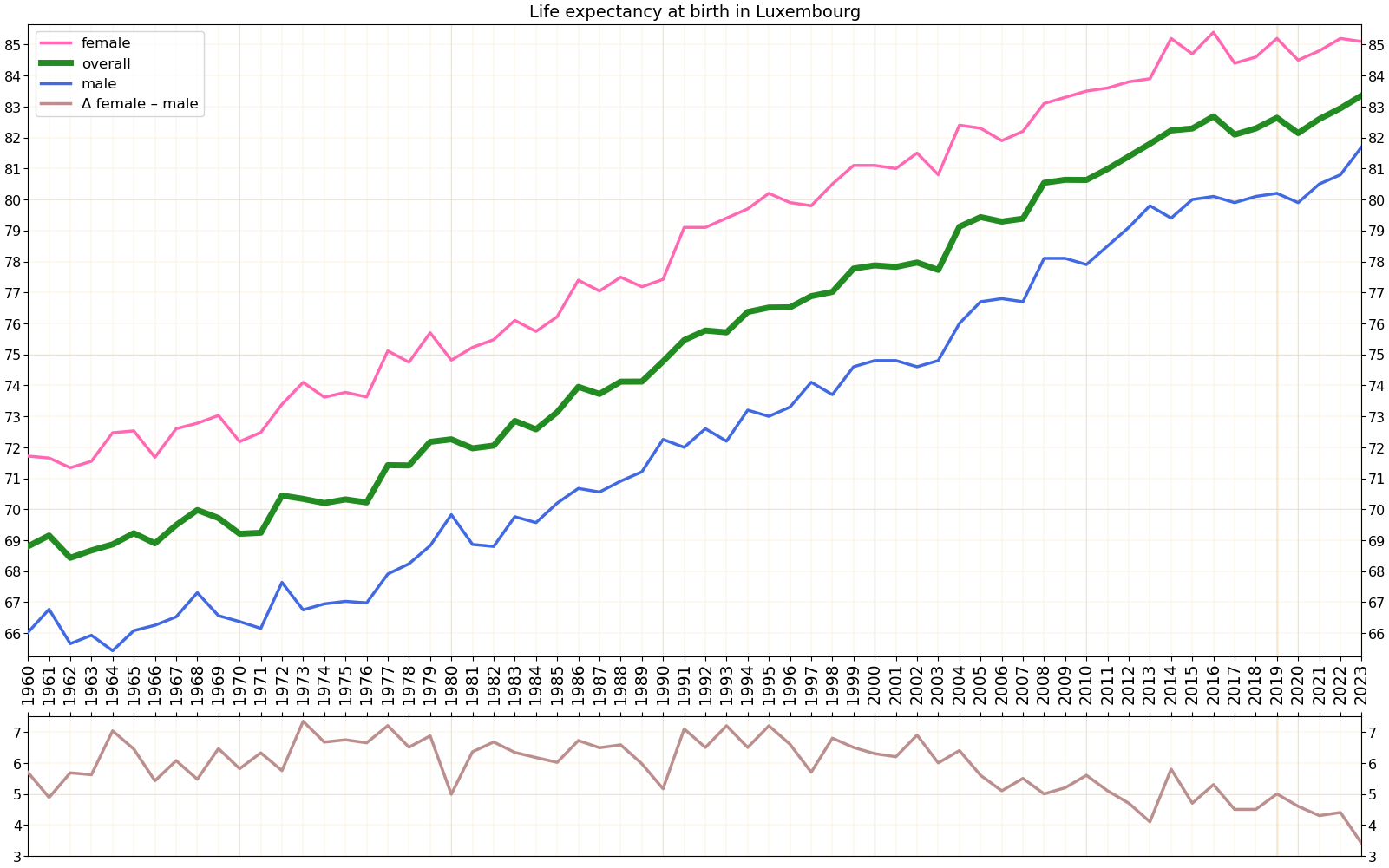
Life expectancy development in Luxembourg by gender

According to data from the World Health Organization (WHO), healthcare spending on behalf of the government of Luxembourg topped $4.1 Billion, amounting to about $8,182 for each citizen in the nation. The entirety of funding comes from domestic sources, where the government covers about 84% of healthcare funding with household expenditures covering the remaining costs. With the allocation of about 15% of total government expenditures toward health programs, the nation of Luxembourg collectively spent nearly 7% of its Gross Domestic Product on health, placing it among the highest spending countries on health services and related programs in 2010 among other well-off nations in Europe with high average income among its population. As a whole, health expenditures take up a share of total GDP at 1.8 percentage points under the average across OECD nations. Before healthcare reform took place in 1992, payment for healthcare services was based on a fee-per-service requirement, whereas now it is based on individual budgets negotiated between health insurance agencies and the hospitals at the nationwide level. The state role at most consists of working with care providers for accreditation, and management of contracts. Citizens pay at most 5% of their annual wage into the nationwide coverage program.

Mutual Medico-Surgical Fund (CMCM)

As Luxembourg's primary voluntary health insurance program, the Cause Médico-Chirurgicale Mutualiste (Mutual Medico-Surgical Fund) covers a wide range of services for citizens such as

- hospital costs not covered by statutory insurance
- additional charges for private hospital room
- pre-operative and post-operative treatment costs
- dental prostheses not covered by the statutory insurance
- diagnostic, medical, operative and hospitalization costs for a surgical intervention abroad
- partial reimbursement where no agreement exists on the cost of a treatment

== Healthcare organization and access ==
Social care

Currently in place is a law passed on September 8, 1998, between the state and non-governmental organizations, (NGO's) working in social care. Independent NGO's work alongside the Ministry of Health and the Ministry of Family and Social Welfare as one of the widest sectors in government assistance, extending social care in Luxembourg to include services such as drug prevention activities, shelter for the country's homeless and resources for single parents, such as childcare and recreational-type activities. Coverage for services deemed nonessential as part of compulsory health insurance frameworks is not only available, but widely utilized, with over 75% of the national population purchasing complementary health insurance to extend the range of care to non-useful services addressing non-threatening conditions.

Insurance

The Statutory health insurance system in Luxembourg is responsible for the healthcare of 99% of its residents. This compulsory system of health insurance is managed and provided by the Union of Sickness Funds alongside 9 separate agencies among which the general population is distributed and allocated on the basis of the professional occupation they hold. All services rendered by professionals are defined and assessed under the Ministers of Social Security and Health. The Voluntary health insurance program has typically been limited as a direct result of the compulsory public system that covers the majority of the population' debts for medical services.

== Primary challenges to national health ==
The EU's "Alcohol Belt" where Alcohol transport policies have made Luxembourg a top consumer and hotspot for alcohol sales in the region

Across Luxembourg one of the greatest problems to the nations's health has been the high number of deaths from non-communicable diseases such as cancer, diabetes, cardiovascular disease, and chronic respiratory diseases, arising from a variety of factors, though most notably from substance abuse. Premature mortality as a direct result of NCD's has been a primary cause of death nationwide, with the probability of dying between the ages of 30 and 70 years at 11%, with cardiovascular disease, chronic respiratory disease, and cancer claiming the most lives among the middle-aged group .

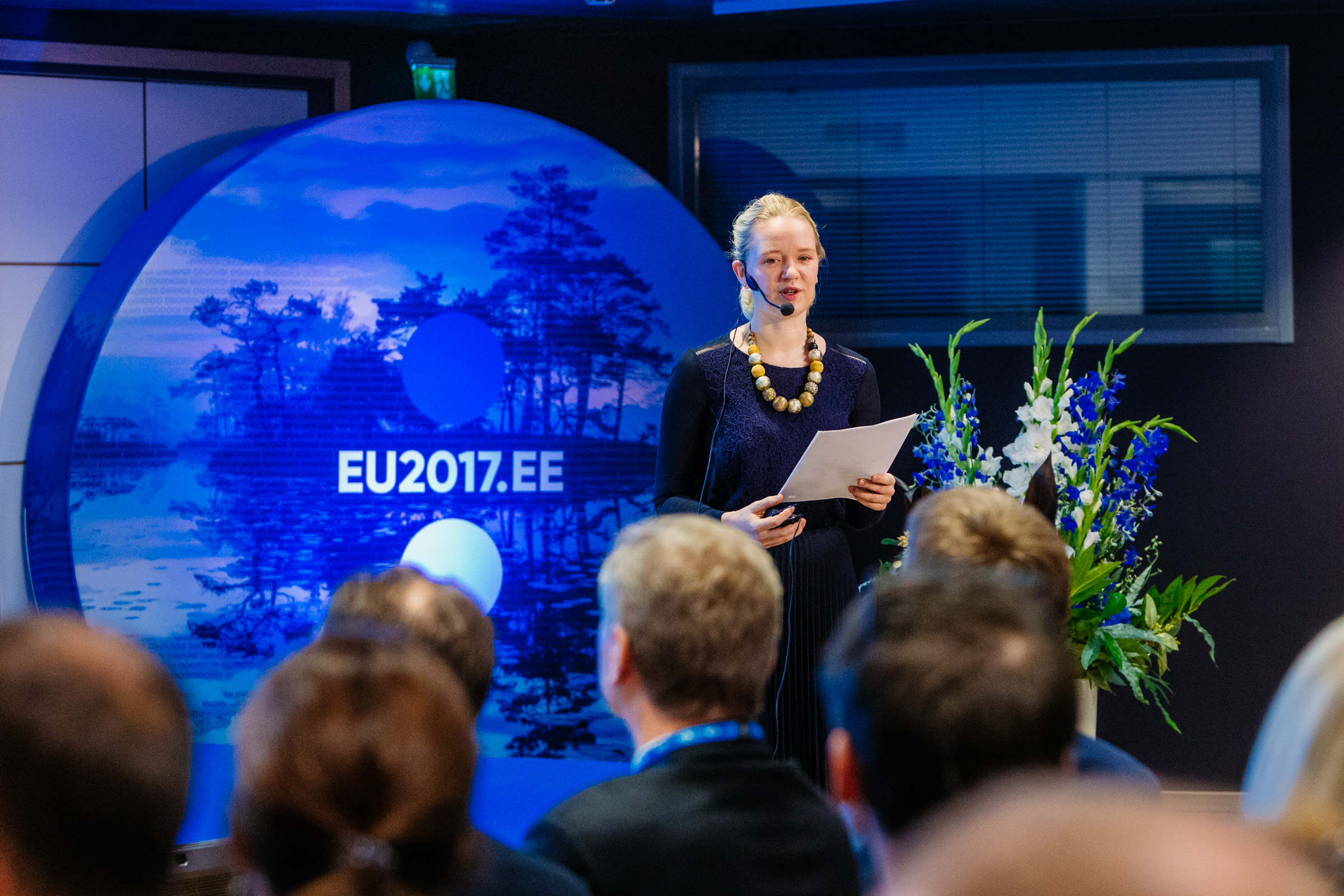
EU conference assessing cross-border alcohol transport policy

Alcohol

Luxembourg boasts one of the highest levels of alcohol consumption among European nations, showcasing an average consumption rate of over 60% above the European average. Alcohol policy within the EU has promoted high levels of consumption through low prices and wide availability. The mortality rate from alcohol-related causes is one of the highest among other European nations such as Slovenia, Croatia, and Finland, evidently a direct result of high levels of consumption as part of harmful drinking patterns among people in Luxembourg. Contributory to high consumption is a relatively cheaper cost of strong alcohol items such as grain alcohol. According to OECD data, 35% of adults in Luxembourg in 2014 consumed large quantities of alcohol in one sitting. Alcohol abuse and dependency have accounted for a considerable share of the alcohol-related diseases observed in the cause of death among citizens .

== See also ==
- List of hospitals in Luxembourg
