= Roe v. Wade (disambiguation) =

Roe v. Wade was a 1973 landmark U.S. Supreme Court decision that established a woman's constitutional right to an abortion that was overturned in 2022.

Roe v. Wade may also refer to:

- Roe vs. Wade (film), a 1989 television film written by Alison Cross
- Roe v. Wade (film), a 2020 film written and directed by Nick Loeb and Cathy Allyn

== See also ==
- United States abortion protests (2022–present), also known as the Roe v. Wade protests, following the 2022 overturning of Roe v. Wade
