= Death of Sha-Asia Washington =

Sha-Asia Washington in 2020

The death of Sha-Asia Washington occurred on July 3, 2020, at the Woodhull Medical Center while she was in childbirth. Her death sparked protests and raised awareness about Black maternal mortality in the United States.

== Death ==
Sha-Asia Washington was a paraprofessional at a charter school in Brooklyn. She went to Woodhull Medical Center on July 2, 2020, for a routine stress test. Washington was a few days past her due date and her blood pressure was high (high blood pressure during pregnancy can be a sign of pre-eclampsia), so after a period of observation, the hospital administered Pitocin to induce labor. A subsequent investigation by the New York Heath State Board found that anesthesiologist Dmitry Anatolevich Shelchkov improperly administered an epidural. They alleged that Shelchkov incorrectly inserted Washington's epidural catheter, and had failed to wait the correct amount of time between administering the test epidural dose, and the anesthetic medication. The investigation found Shelchkov had also failed to keep adequate notes, having failed to note the anesthetics used on Washington. Washington went into cardiac arrest, at which point the doctors performed an emergency Caesarean section. Washington's baby was delivered safely and in good health, but after 45 minutes of cardiopulmonary resuscitation, Washington was pronounced dead.

Shelchkov lost his medical license in late 2021. The investigation into his actions found that he had lied about the depth he had inserted Washington's epidural catheter. In a December 2020 interview with the Office of Professional Medical Conduct, Shelchkov falsely reported that he did not administer additional anesthetic to Washington following the epidural test dose.

== Reactions ==
Washington's death sparked protests at the medical center and brought attention to the wider issue of Black maternal mortality in the United States.

New York state senators Julia Salazar and Gustavo Rivera co-sponsored bill S8729 that would require hospitals to release statistics related to childbirth complications, fetal loss, and maternity-related injuries.

In the fall of 2020, mural artist Danielle Mastrion painted a mural of Washington on Lewis Avenue in Bedford–Stuyvesant, Brooklyn. A memorial garden for Washington was established in Bedford-Stuyvesant.

== See also ==
- Death of Amber Nicole Thurman
- Death of Chaniece Wallace
- Medical racism in the United States
- Race and maternal health in the United States
- Women's health movement in the United States
