= Death of Chaniece Wallace =

2020 death from complications of pregnancy

Chaniece Wallace (1990 − October 22, 2020), an American woman and physician, died at age 30 from complications of pregnancy two days after the birth of her daughter. Her death is seen as preventable and is viewed in the context of high rates of maternal mortality in the United States, particularly among the African American population. It is cited as an example in medical and scholarly publications to call for improved health outcomes in the black U.S. population. Wallace died despite several factors seen as protective: she was "highly educated, employed as a health care practitioner, had access to health care, and had a supportive family." Wallace was a fourth-year pediatric chief resident at the Indiana University School of Medicine and was working at Riley Children's Health Hospital at the time of her death.

Wallace had headaches that started in early October 2020 and worsened during the month. She was admitted to the hospital for high blood pressure after a previously scheduled appointment on October 20, 2020. She had an emergency caesarean section that day in the setting of pre-eclampsia. Hypertensive disease of pregnancy (from pre-eclampsia) with liver rupture and kidney damage contributed to her death. Dr. Monique Rainford, an assistant professor of clinical obstetrics, gynecology, and reproductive sciences at the Yale School of Medicine, wrote of the cause of Wallace's death in her book Pregnant While Black: Advancing Justice for Maternal Health in America. She wrote that "among Dr. Wallace's complications was a 'ruptured liver'—a known, but rare and severe, complication of preeclampsia/eclampsia and/or HELLP syndrome. 'Ruptured liver' can refer to spontaneous rupture of a subcapsular liver hematoma (collection of blood between the liver and a layer of tissue surrounding it) or of the liver itself. It is a rare incident occurring in 1 in 40,000 to 1 in 250,000 deliveries and in about 1% to less than 2% of the cases with HELLP syndrome." Rainford recalled only one similar case in her career, which occurred while she was in training. The woman's life was spared, an outcome which she attributed to both good medicine (including surgery) and divine fortune.

Lindsey Carr, associate editor of Contemporary OB/GYN, commented that Wallace's death "highlights the glaring racial disparities in maternal mortality and morbidity for Black women in the U.S. The pregnancy-related mortality rate for Black women is 5.2 times higher than for white women, and the rates of maternal mortality and severe maternal morbidity are 3 to 4 times higher in Black women than in white women."

Wallace's death was honored at the 2020 meeting of American College of Obstetricians and Gynecologists by a moment of silence. She was a native of Alabama and completed her undergraduate at Alabama A&M University and her medical degrees at the University of Alabama. Wallace wed her husband Anthony in April 2015. Their daughter was named Charlotte. Wallace's August 2021 memorial service was documented with a picture gallery published by The Indianapolis Star.

== See also ==
- Aspirin section of pre-eclampsia article
- Death of Amber Nicole Thurman
- Death of Sha-Asia Washington
- Implicit bias
- Institutional racism
