= United States abortion protests (2022–present) =

2022 protests following the ruling of Dobbs v. Jackson Women's Health Organization

- Part of the United States abortion-rights movement and the United States anti-abortion movement
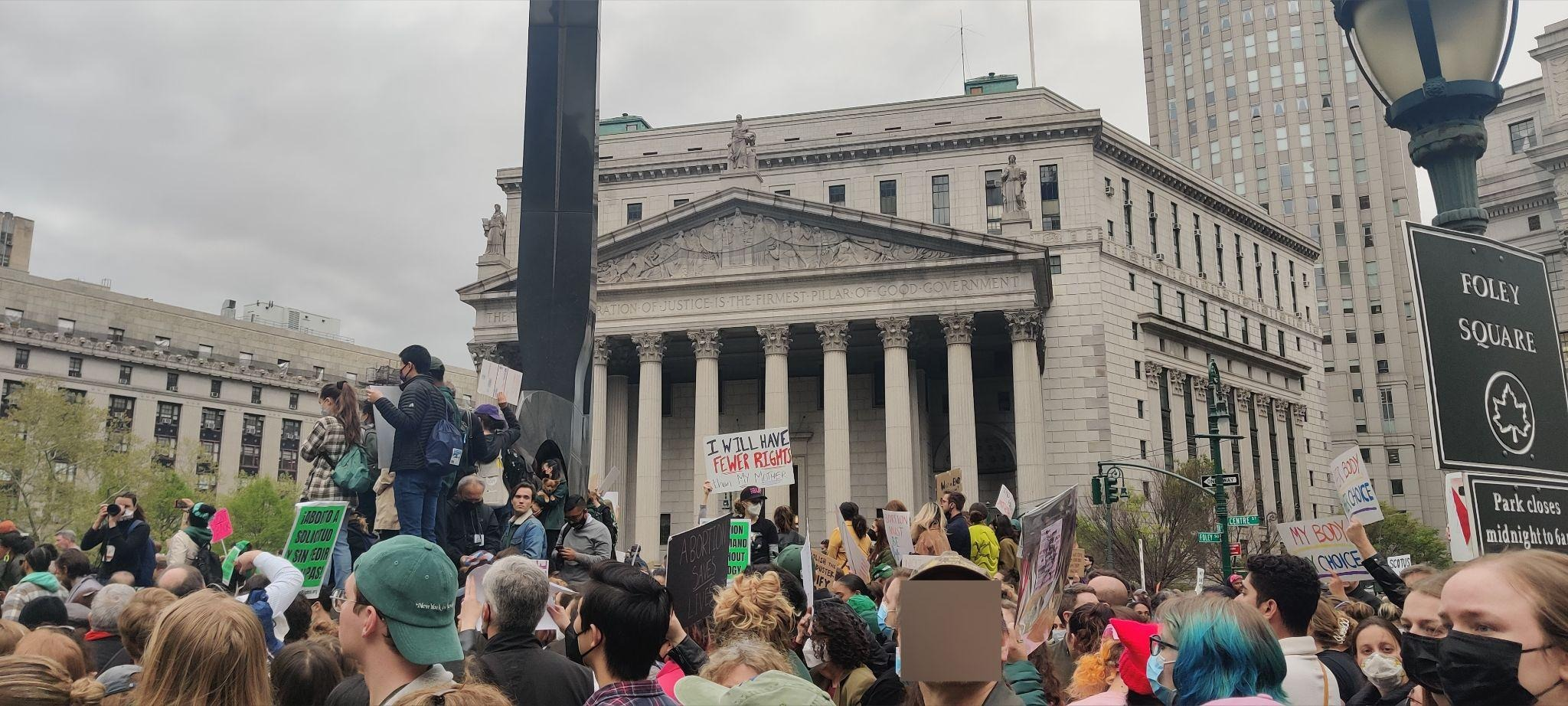
- Protest at Foley Square on May 3, 2022
- Date: May 2, 2022 – present (4 years, 6 months, 2 weeks and 5 days)
- Location: United States
- Caused by: The Supreme Court overturning Roe v. Wade and Planned Parenthood v. Casey with the decision in Dobbs v. Jackson Women's Health Organization
- Methods: Protests, demonstrations
- Status: Ongoing

A series of ongoing protests supporting abortion rights and anti-abortion counter-protests began in the United States on May 2, 2022, following the leak of a draft majority opinion for the U.S. Supreme Court case Dobbs v. Jackson Women's Health Organization, which stated that the Constitution of the United States does not confer any reproductive rights, thus overturning Roe v. Wade and Planned Parenthood v. Casey. On June 24, 2022, the Supreme Court officially overturned Roe and Casey in Dobbs, resulting in further protests outside of the U.S. Supreme Court building and across the country, eventually to major cities across the world both in favor of and against the decision.

== Background ==
=== Leaked draft opinion ===
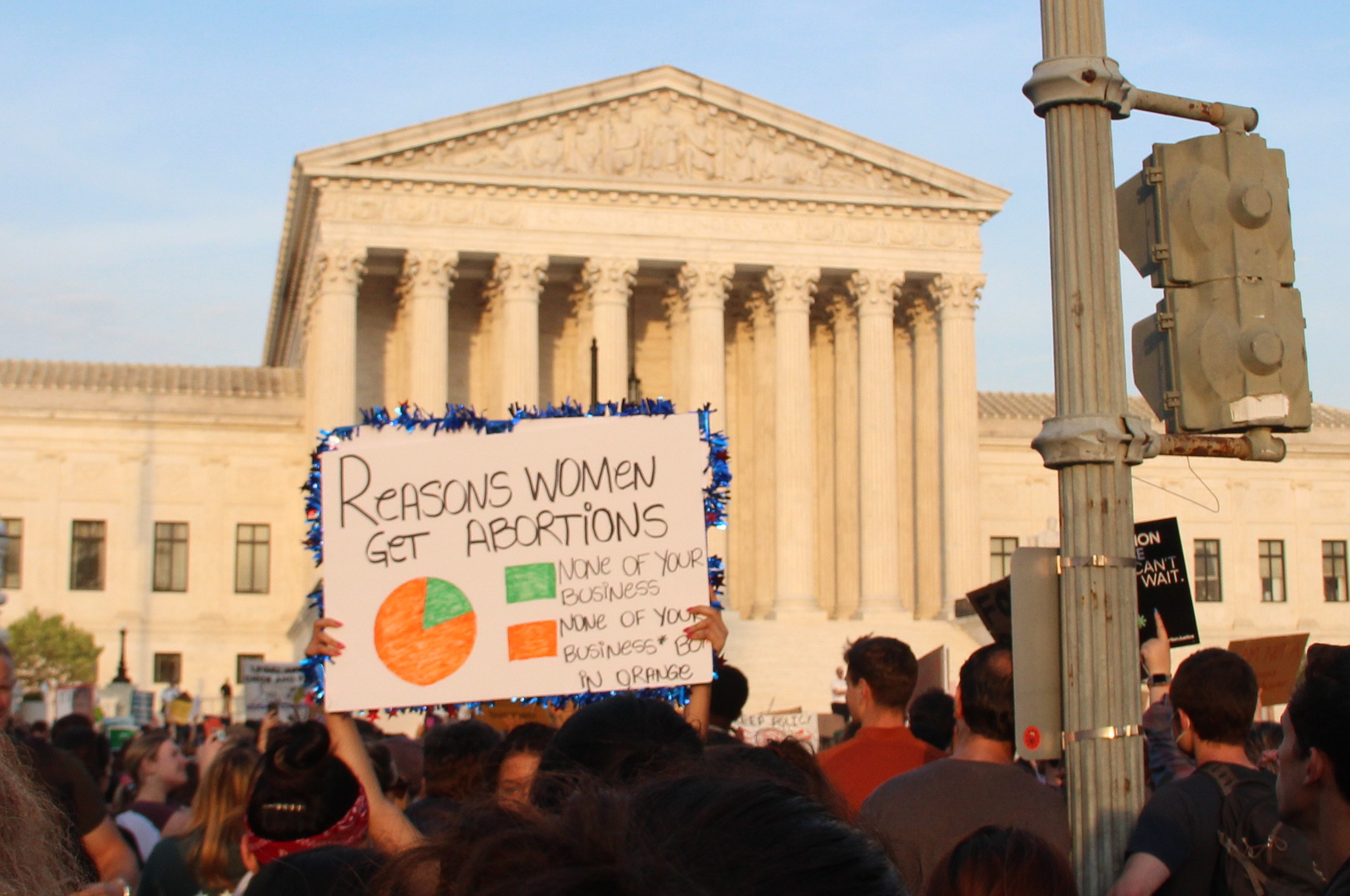
Protest in Washington, D.C.

On May 2, 2022, Politico released a first draft of a majority opinion written by Justice Samuel Alito, the authenticity of which Politico said it had verified. The draft opinion would overturn Roe v. Wade and Planned Parenthood v. Casey if held by the majority and thereby finalized in that form. Alito's draft decision called the Roe decision "egregiously wrong from the start" on the grounds that abortion is not listed in the United States Constitution as a protected right, and instead would allow states to decide on abortion restrictions or guarantees under the Tenth Amendment to the U.S. Constitution. Justice Samuel Alito stated the original decision was, "an abuse of judicial authority." The opposing Justices Stephen Breyer, Sonia Sotomayor, and Elena Kagan shared their stance with this statement, "With sorrow — for this Court, but more, for the many millions of American women who have today lost a fundamental constitutional protection — we dissent."

Shortly after the release of the document, multiple protests occurred in cities throughout the country and outside the U.S. Supreme Court Building in Washington, D.C., along with multiple individuals such as lawyers, politicians, and activist groups speaking out about the leaked draft. The Supreme Court is typically very careful about any information being leaked, which added to the shock that many people felt when it was released.

=== Overturning of Roe v. Wade ===
On June 24, 2022, in a 5–4 decision, the Supreme Court officially overturned Roe v. Wade and Planned Parenthood v. Casey. The decision was divisive among the American public, with 55 to 60% "split between those who think that it (abortion) should be mostly legal with some exceptions and mostly illegal but with exceptions" and was generally condemned by international observers and foreign leaders, resulting in further protests.

== Protests before the ruling ==
According to The Hill, the Reproductive Freedom Protest (RFP) planned walkouts at more than 20 U.S. universities, including Brown University, Florida International University, Georgetown University, Hamilton College, Purdue University, the University of California, Berkeley, the University of Virginia, Virginia Commonwealth University, and Virginia Tech.

=== Midwest ===
Illinois saw protests in Bloomington, Chicago, Peoria, Rockford, and Springfield. On May 7, more than 1,000 abortion-rights protesters met and marched in downtown Chicago. Governor J. B. Pritzker and Lieutenant Governor Juliana Stratton spoke to the crowd in Federal Plaza. On May 14, thousands of abortion rights protesters, and a group of anti-abortion activists, met and marched in Union Park and Beverly in Chicago. On May 20, a majority of students at Lake Forest High School in Lake Forest walked out in protest of the leaked draft Supreme Court decision.

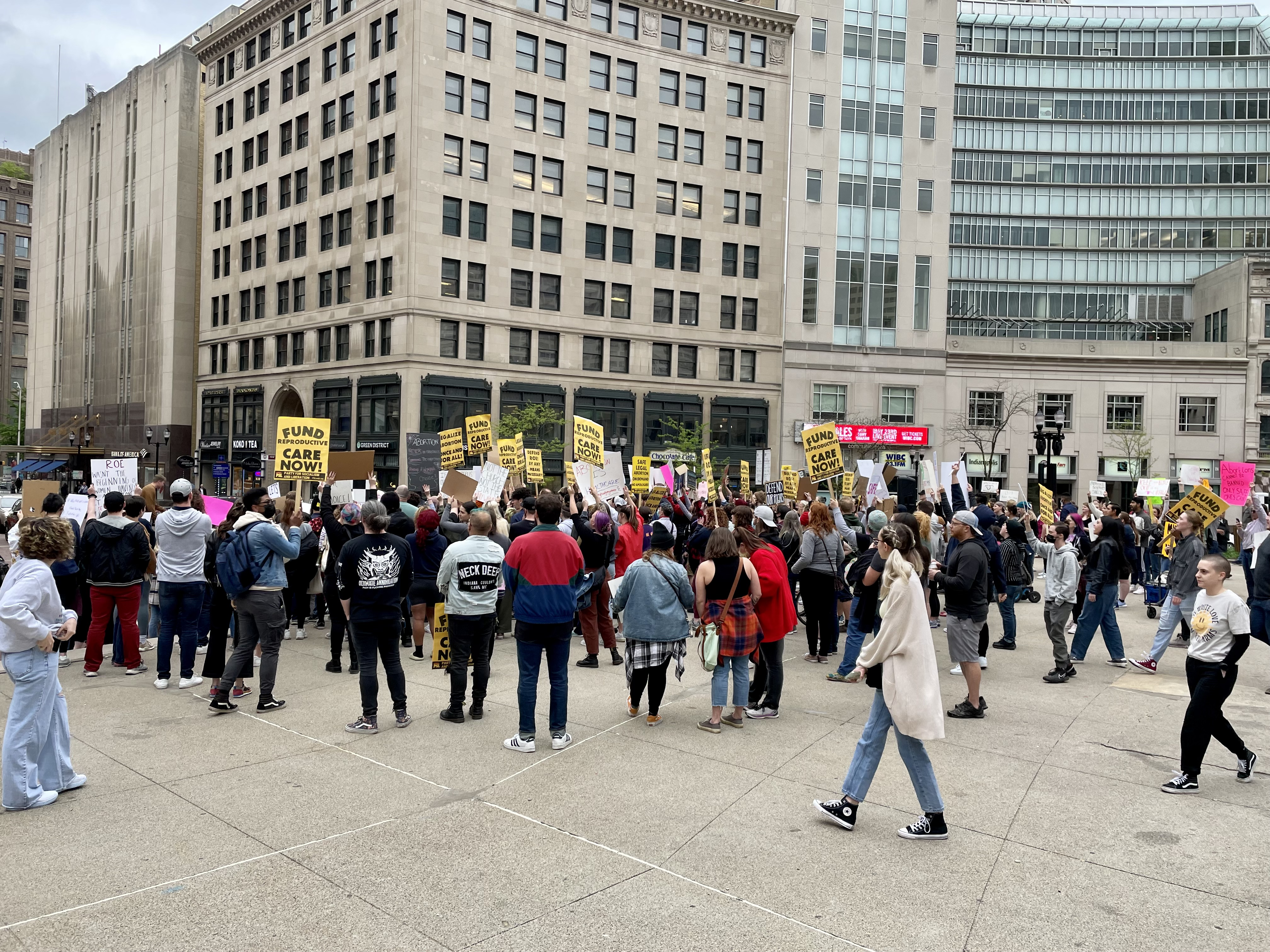
Protest in Indianapolis

More than a dozen people gathered at Four Freedoms Monument in Evansville, Indiana. In Indianapolis, pro-abortion rights and anti-abortion protesters gathered outside downtown's federal courthouse. Approximately 30 protesters assembled outside the Tippecanoe County Courthouse in Lafayette, including state representative Chris Campbell. On May 22, protesters returned to the Four Freedoms Monument in Evansville.

In Iowa, there were demonstrations in Cedar Rapids and Des Moines. Additionally, approximately 100 students held a protest at Northview Middle School in Ankeny. Americans for Democratic Action Iowa organized a rally in Waterloo.

In Michigan, the Ann Arbor event was held outside the federal building. Dozens of people attended the rally outside the Theodore Levin United States Courthouse in Detroit, including Cynthia A. Johnson and Rashida Tlaib. Approximately 250 people rallied outside the Kent County Courthouse in Grand Rapids. Approximately 300 people participated in the demonstration at the Michigan State Capitol in Lansing, including a dozen or so anti-abortion activists. Stephanie Chang spoke at the rally. The rally outside Midland's County Courthouse was organized by the Women of Michigan Action Network and attended by approximately 150 people. On May 10, several speakers including abortion providers and president of the Detroit City Council were scheduled to speak at Spirit Plaza. Michigan Attorney General Dana Nessel left the event before being introduced after several of the speakers were interrupted by protesters. On May 14, about 2.000 protesters at the University of Michigan campus in Ann Arbor and 500 protested in downtown Detroit. Hundreds of anti-abortion and abortion-rights protesters marched in front of Grand Rapids City Hall. On June 8, dozens of abortion rights activists protested in the gallery of the Michigan House in Lansing. On June 12, abortion rights protesters disrupted a Catholic Mass in Eastpointe.

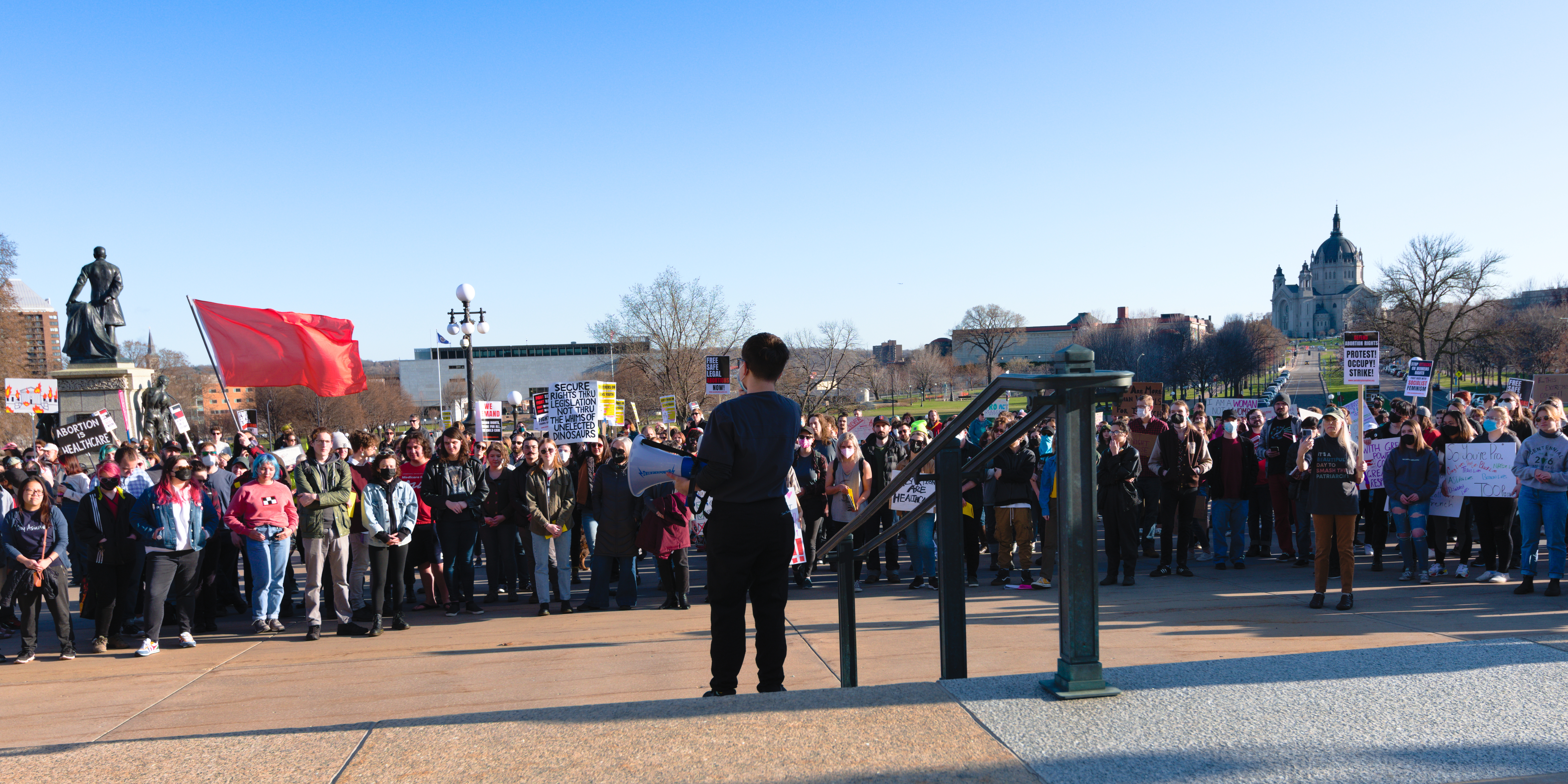
Protest in Saint Paul, Minnesota

In Minnesota, there were demonstrations in Minneapolis and Saint Paul. In Missouri, there were protests in Kansas City, Springfield, Joplin, and St. Louis. A demonstration was held in Omaha, Nebraska.

Ohio saw protests in Cincinnati, Columbus, Dayton, Toledo, and Youngstown. Additionally, students gathered at the Kent State University campus in Kent. More than a thousand protesters showed up in Cleveland's Willard Park for the Bans Off Our Bodies march on May 14. On June 12, dozens of abortion rights protestors gathered in Toledo.

In Wisconsin, demonstrations were held in La Crosse, Madison, and Milwaukee. On May 22, protesters rallying for abortion rights gathered in Green Bay. On June 12, dozens of abortion rights protestors marched in Greenfield.

=== Northeast ===
Connecticut saw protests in Bridgeport, New Haven, and Norwalk. Students and faculty also protested at Quinnipiac University's Mount Carmel campus in Hamden. In Maine, there were protests in Bangor and Portland. Additionally, students held demonstrations at Bates College in Lewiston and Edward Little High School in Auburn.

In Portland, Maine, dozens of abortion rights activists debated and shouted with 5 to 10 anti-abortion protesters at Monument Square on May 13.

In Massachusetts, approximately 1,000 people participated in the rally at Boston Common. Pro-abortion and anti-abortion students held rallies at the Harvard University campus in Cambridge. A demonstration was held in Longmeadow on Mother's Day. On Nantucket, people assembled at Brant Point Light. Approximately 30 people gathered outside City Hall in North Adams. The Northampton rally was held at City Hall. Mayor Joseph Petty attended the event in Worcester, as did members of Pathways for Change. Students from Clark University marched from campus to the Worcester Courthouse.

New Hampshire saw protests at the New Hampshire State House in Concord.

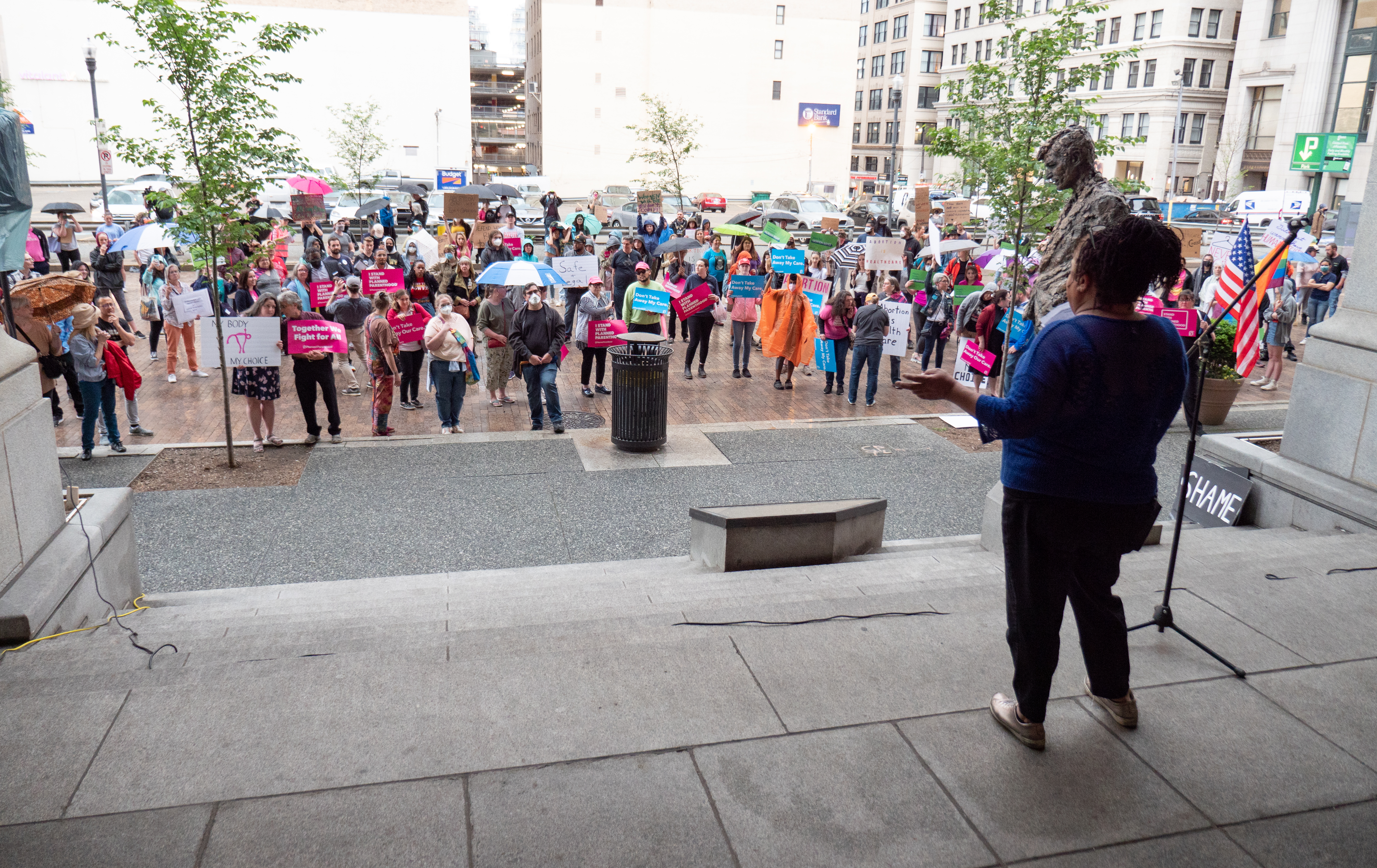
Demonstrators in Pittsburgh

In New Jersey, hundreds protested in Montclair and at the Somerset County Courthouse in Somerville. Additionally, approximately 100 people gathered outside Nassau Hall on the Princeton University campus in Princeton. On May 13, a group of seniors organized a rally attended by former New Jersey State Senator Loretta Weinberg at the Arbor Terrace senior housing center in Teaneck. On May 14, hundreds rallied at Mindowaskin Park in Westfield. On May 16, an abortion-rights rally at Hunterdon Central Regional High School lead to some pushing and shoving between students.

Pennsylvania saw protests in Allentown, Lancaster, Philadelphia, and Pittsburgh. Protests were also held in Providence, Rhode Island, and Essex Junction, Vermont. On May 14, nearly a thousand protesters rallied around the Pittsburgh City-County Building and about 150 rallied in Bethlehem for the Bans Off Our Bodies event.

==== New York ====
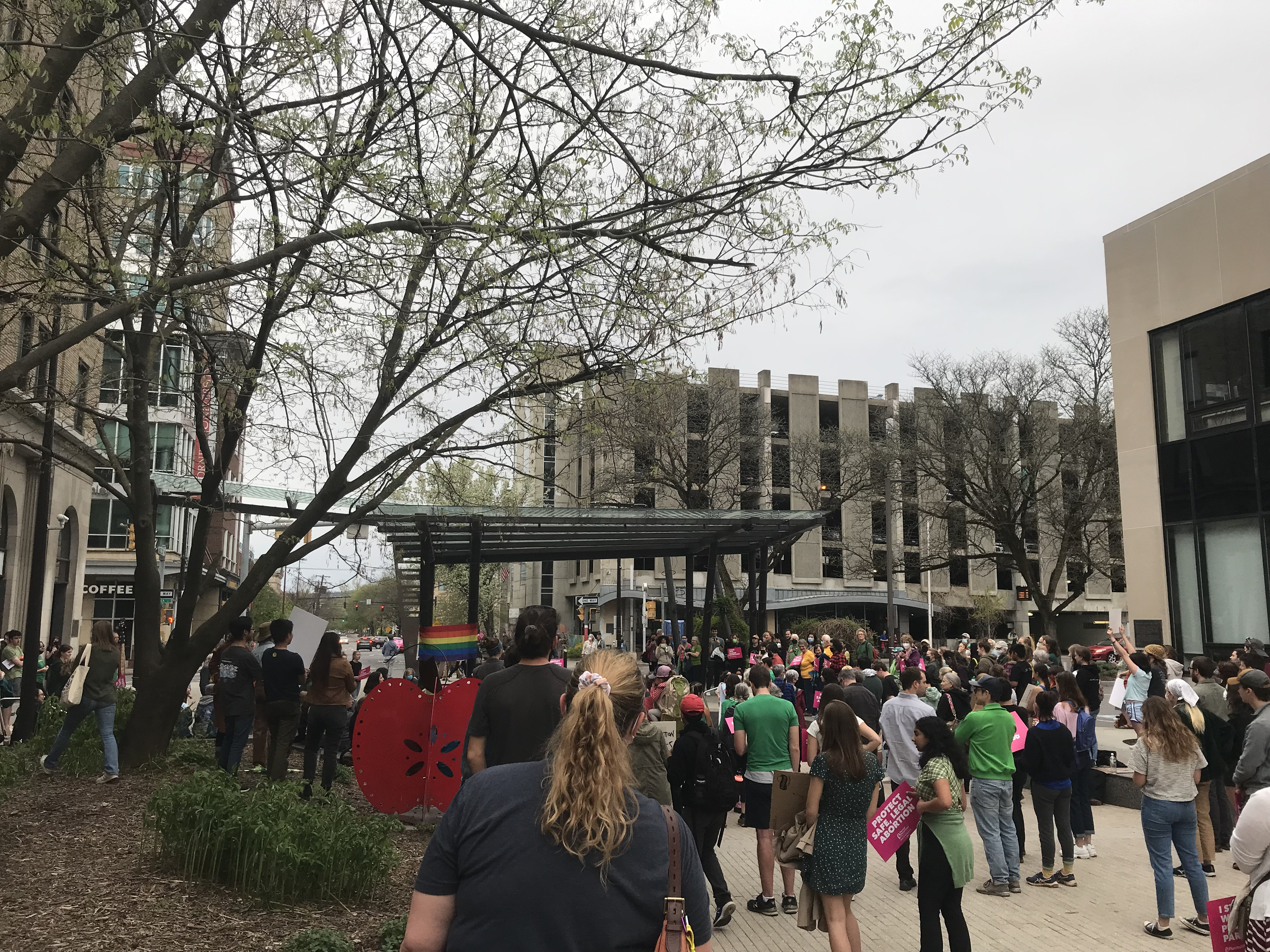
Abortions-rights rally in Ithaca, New York

On May 3, protesters gathered at the New York State Capitol in Albany. Kathy Hochul spoke at the event. In Ithaca, approximately 100 people gathered at the Ithaca Commons Bernie Milton Pavilion, including students from Cornell University and Ithaca College. In New York City, more than 1,000 people gathered at Foley Square in Lower Manhattan. Letitia James and students from Trinity School were in attendance. Demonstrators also met at the Barclays Center in Brooklyn, and in New Springville, Staten Island. In Orange County, demonstrators gathered outside of Assemblyman Colin Schmitt's office. In Syracuse, hundreds of people assembled at downtown's federal building. The rally was organized by Women's March Syracuse.

On May 7 in Long Island, hundreds protested in Mineola and Central Islip. Speakers included Senator Chuck Schumer, Attorney General Letitia James, Assemblymember Gina Sillitti and State Senator Anna Kaplan at the Nassau County Courthouse.

On June 7, topless activists with messages like "Hell no!" and "My Body, My Choice" written on their bodies disrupted a WNBA game between the New York Liberty and the Minnesota Lynx at Barclays Center in Brooklyn.

=== South ===
Demonstrations were held in Birmingham, Alabama, Fayetteville, Arkansas, and Wilmington, Delaware. In Maryland, there was a protest in Baltimore, and approximately 100 people gathered outside the homes of Justices Brett Kavanaugh and John Roberts in Chevy Chase on May 7.

In Georgia, there were protests in Athens, Atlanta, and Savannah. Kentucky saw demonstrations in Lexington and Louisville. There was a protest in New Orleans, Louisiana. On May 21, a protest occurred in Augusta.

In Mississippi, protests increased in Jackson outside the Jackson Women's Health Organization, the state's last abortion clinic which is the plaintiff in the case which overturned Roe v. Wade. On May 3, the director announced that they would move their office to New Mexico if the Supreme Court rules against them. In North Carolina, there were demonstrations in Asheville and Raleigh. There were also protests in Norman and Oklahoma City, Oklahoma, and in Charleston, South Carolina.

North Carolina saw hundreds protesting Greensboro, Winston-Salem, Raleigh and Asheville on May 14.

In Tennessee, protesters marched from Miller Park to the Hamilton County Courthouse in Chattanooga. Approximately 100 people gathered at Founders Park in Johnson City. Approximately 100 people gathered outside Knoxville's Howard H. Baker Jr. Courthouse for the "Knoxville Rally to Defend Roe. Wade", which was organized by the Women's March Coalition and the Knoxville Center for Reproductive Health. Hundreds gathered outside the federal courthouse in Nashville. On May 14, dozens protested in Bristol, Tennessee.

Texas saw demonstrations in Amarillo, Austin, Bryan, Dallas, El Paso, Houston, and San Antonio. Dozens gathered outside the Tarrant County Courthouse in Fort Worth. Beto O'Rourke organized an abortion-rights rally that saw thousands gather at Discovery Green in downtown Houston, including some anti-abortion activists. On May 14, a Bans Off Our Bodies rally was held in Austin that featured speakers state Representative Donna Howard and U.S. Representative Lloyd Doggett. On June 5, three activists organized by Rise 4 Abortion Rights stripped down to their underwear during services at megachurch pastor Joel Osteen's Lakewood Church in Houston.

In Virginia, protests were held in Norfolk, Richmond, and Roanoke. Protests were planned by the Virginia League of Planned Parenthood, the groups Shutdown DC and Ruth Sent Us promoted vigils, walk-by and demonstrations outside of Justice Samuel Alito and conservative justices homes in Maryland and Virginia.

==== Florida ====
In Florida, demonstrations were held in Bradenton, Fort Lauderdale, Gainesville, Jacksonville, Miami, Orlando, St. Augustine, St. Petersburg, Tallahassee, Tampa, and West Palm Beach. Approximately 100 people gathered in Stuart.

More than 100 people gathered outside St. Petersburg's courthouse for a rally organized by state representative Michele Rayner and the Pinellas Democratic Progressive Caucus; separately, the Party for Socialism and Liberation in Tampa Bay held an abortion-rights rally that was attended by an estimated 150 to 250 people according to organizers. Approximately 100 people participated in the demonstration outside the Supreme Court of Florida in Tallahassee; the event was supported by the activist group Tallahassee Community Action Committee. Approximately 75 people attended the rally at Tampa's Joe Chillura Courthouse Square, including U.S. Representative Kathy Castor.

On June 10, a synagogue in Boynton Beach filed a lawsuit against the state of Florida regarding their 15-week abortion ban, stating that the ban violated religious freedom of Jews.

==== Washington, D.C. ====
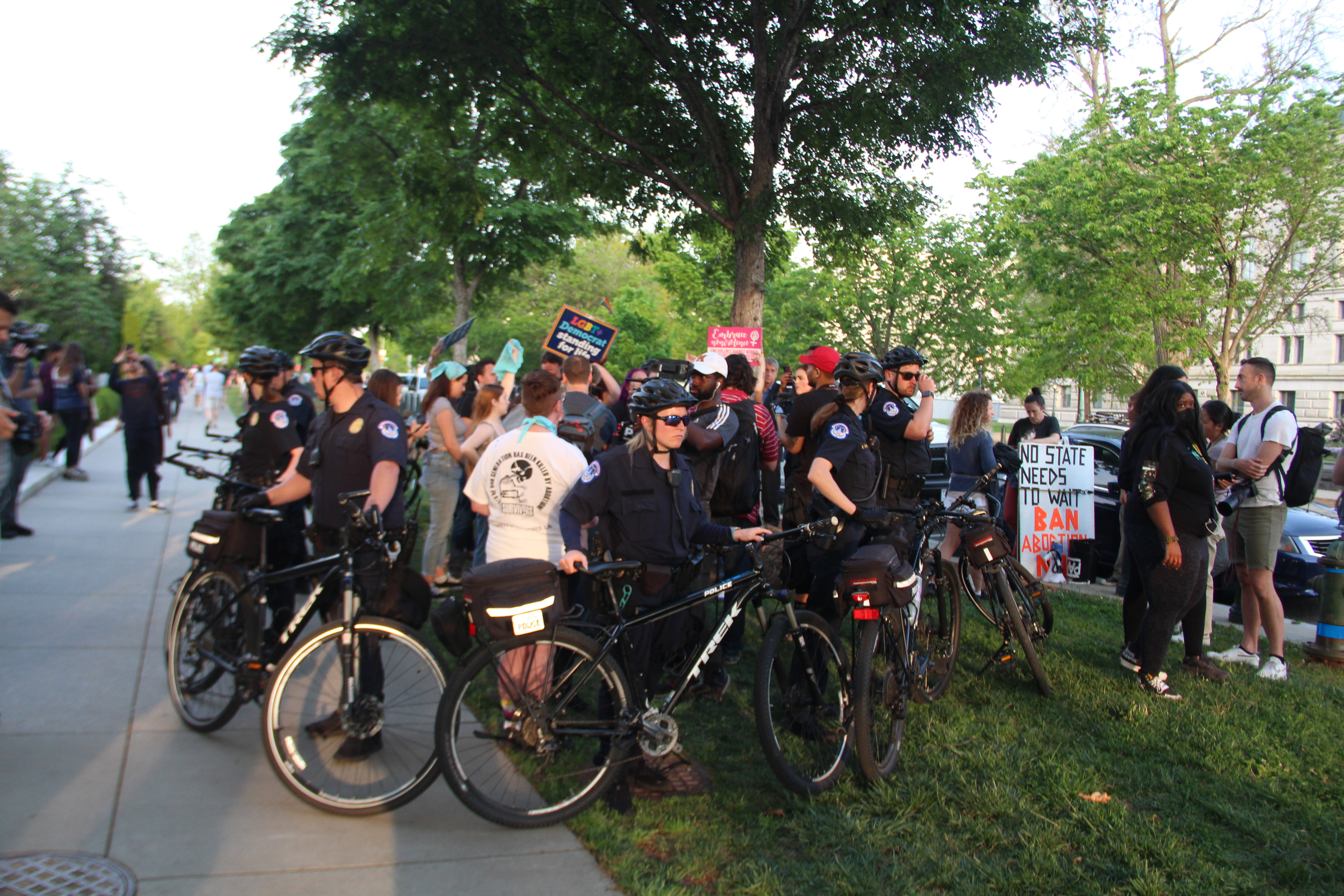
Anti-abortion protest in Washington, D.C., May 3, 2022

There were no arrests at the protest in Washington, D.C., which attracted both pro-abortion and anti-abortion protesters to the Supreme Court Building. A planned group protest was held on May 14, and organized by Woman's March, Planned Parenthood Federation of America, the Service Employees International Union, and other pro-abortion rights organizations, to coincide with more than 370 events across the United States. The permit for the event showed an expected attendance of 17,000 people and included a march and speakers.

On June 6, a man chained himself to a fence in front of the Supreme Court building in support of abortion rights.

=== West ===
Alaska saw protests in Anchorage, Fairbanks, and Haines. In Arizona, hundreds protested in Phoenix and Tucson. Additionally, two women organized a demonstration in San Luis, Arizona.

In Colorado, there were demonstrations in Aspen, Colorado Springs, Denver, Fort Collins, and Grand Junction.

A demonstration was held in Boise, Idaho. On November 10, two abortion rights protesters who were present at the Boise, Idaho protests filed tort claims against the city, alleging that they were falsely arrested and imprisoned in violation of constitutional rights to peacefully assemble.

Hawaii faced protests outside the District of Hawaii courthouse in Honolulu as well as other places like Waimea. Montana saw protests in Billings, Bozeman, Helena, and Missoula. A protest was also held in Las Vegas, Nevada.

In New Mexico, there were demonstrations in Albuquerque, Las Cruces, and Santa Fe. On May 14, Albuquerque saw more than 200 protesters gather at Tiguex Park and march around Old Town.

In Oregon, approximately 200 people gathered outside the Deschutes County Courthouse in Bend. The "Rally for Womb Rights: We Will Never Go Back" event in Eugene was held outside the Wayne Lyman Morse United States Courthouse. Several hundred people participated in the rally at Lownsdale Square in downtown Portland. There was some damage by "splinter groups", which was condemned by mayor Ted Wheeler, and one person was arrested. On May 3, hundreds marched from Riverfront Park to the Oregon State Capitol in Salem. On May 14, protesters on both sides of the issue gathered in front of the Federal Courthouse in Eugene. On May 15, about 400 protesters gathered in front of the Oregon State Capitol in Salem for the second annual "Defend Roe" rally, organized by "Pro Choice with Heart."

In Utah, protests were held in Salt Lake City and St. George. On May 14, about 4,000 protesters rallied at the Utah State Capitol for a Bans Off Our Bodies protest.

In the state of Washington, there were demonstrations in Bellingham, Olympia, Richland, Spokane, Tacoma, Vancouver, and Walla Walla. Additionally, approximately 60 people gathered at the Clallam County Courthouse in Port Angeles, and dozens gathered outside the courthouse in Port Townsend. A demonstration was also held in Jackson Hole, Wyoming. In Seattle, protests were held at Westlake Park downtown on May 3 and on May 5, a protest was organized by students on the campus of the University of Washington.

==== California ====
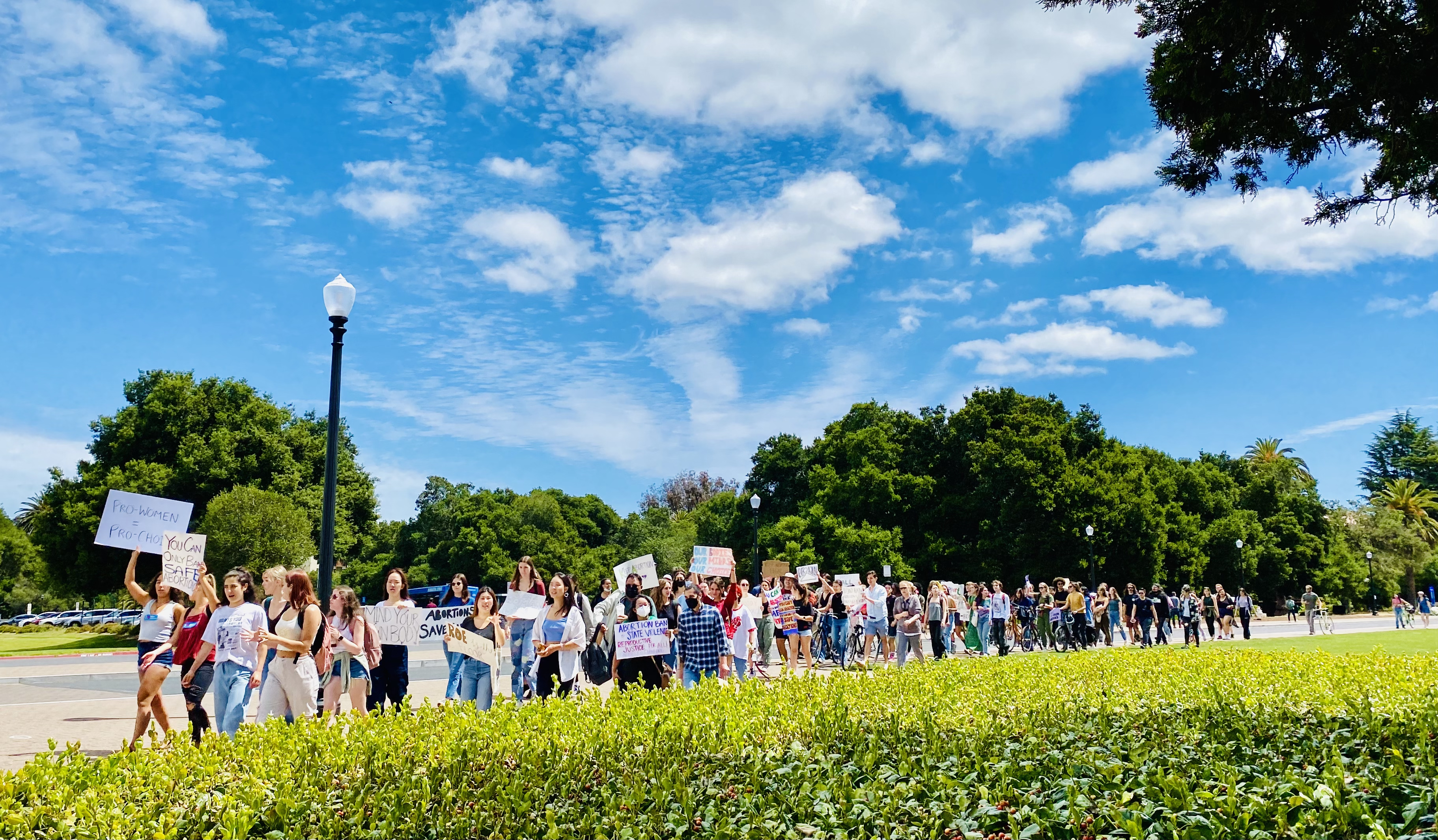
Rally at Stanford University

California saw protests in Chico, Long Beach, Monterey, Oakland, Orange County, Sacramento, San Francisco, San Luis Obispo, Santa Barbara, Santa Clarita, and Stockton. In Berkeley, students gathered at Sproul Plaza on the University of California campus. On May 14, thousands marched across the San Francisco Bay Area, being engaged by small numbers of anti-abortion activists. On June 13, an abortion rights protestor was injected with a sedative without consent by the San Francisco police and fire departments, and later filed a lawsuit against the city.

Protests in Los Angeles, near Pershing Square, turned violent as demonstrators clashed with the Los Angeles Police Department (LAPD), resulting in several arrests and an officer receiving a head injury. A tactical alert was issued for all LAPD personnel in Los Angeles. By 11 pm, it was downgraded to only cover downtown. On May 7, approximately 100 people rallied in West Hollywood. Approximately 100 students also gathered at Pomona College in Claremont. People assembled at Meyerhoff Park outside Kerckhoff Hall on the UCLA campus. On May 14, a Bans Off Our Bodies protest was held at Jastro Park in Bakersfied.

In San Diego, hundreds of protesters marched downtown on May 4. Dozens of students protested outside Geisel Library on the University of California, San Diego campus on May 6. On Mother's Day May 7, CBS 8 counted over 100 people marching through Balboa Park.

On May 21, around 50 high school students organized an abortion-rights protest in Sebastopol.

=== Outside the United States ===
Hundreds attended a demonstration at Dam Square in Amsterdam. Two people were arrested. A demonstration was also held in Battersea, London.

== Women's March ==
Women's March, along with Planned Parenthood and other abortion-rights groups, organized large-scale marches across the United States on May 14.

== Response ==
Women's March supported the national demonstration. Multiple politicians made comments about the protests and those protesting after the leaked opinion, with some causing debates and past comments or actions brought into the discussion. Representative Matt Gaetz (R-FL) used Twitter to claim any women participating in the protests were "over-educated, under-loved millennials who sadly return from protests to a lonely microwave dinner with their cats, and no Bumble matches". Rebekah Jones and Margaret Schiller, both Democrats seeking the district seat, responded by referencing an ongoing federal investigation into allegations that Gaetz had traveled out of state to have sex with a teenage girl.

=== About protests outside private homes ===
After protests outside of the homes of Justices John Roberts and Brett Kavanaugh in early May 2022, White House Press Secretary Jen Psaki tweeted that while President Joe Biden was a strong believer in the constitutional right to protest, it should never include violence, threats, or vandalism. Psaki added that Judges were a highly important function in the United States and must be able to do their jobs without concern for personal safety. The U.S. Capitol Police and the National Fusion Center Association alerted to potential violence in Washington, D.C., against the nine justices and their staffs as well as nationwide against abortion-related advocacy groups and First Amendment-protected events. In May, senators Chris Coons (D-DE) and John Cornyn (R-TX) introduced legislation to allow Supreme Court Police to provide all nine justices and their families 24-hour protection. The bill passed the U.S. House of Representatives on June 14 in a 396–27 vote, with opposition from some New Jersey Democrats who wished to broaden the bill to also protect the family members of Supreme Court staff, and was signed into law by President Biden on June 16.

Republicans argued that those protests violate a 1950 federal law that criminalizes attempting to influence a judge in the course of their official duties by demonstrating at their residence. (Note: 18 U.S.C. § 1507) Maryland governor Larry Hogan and Virginia governor Glenn Youngkin cited the law in a request to the U.S. Department of Justice for adequate resources to protect the justices and their families. Justice Clarence Thomas said the Supreme Court would not "be bullied" by the demonstrators. Senator Ted Cruz (R-TX) stated in an interview with Maria Bartiromo on Fox News that the protests at the Justices homes were "mob violence to get their partisan outcome"; however, reports from both protests claimed to show no violence and about 100 protestors attending the protests.

On May 16, Florida governor Ron DeSantis signed a law making it a second-degree misdemeanor to protest in front of private citizen's homes in Florida, saying, "Sending unruly mobs to private residences, like we have seen with the angry crowds in front of the homes of Supreme Court justices, is inappropriate." Despite the timing, the law was unrelated to the Dobbs decision, as it had been introduced two months prior.

== Protests after the ruling ==
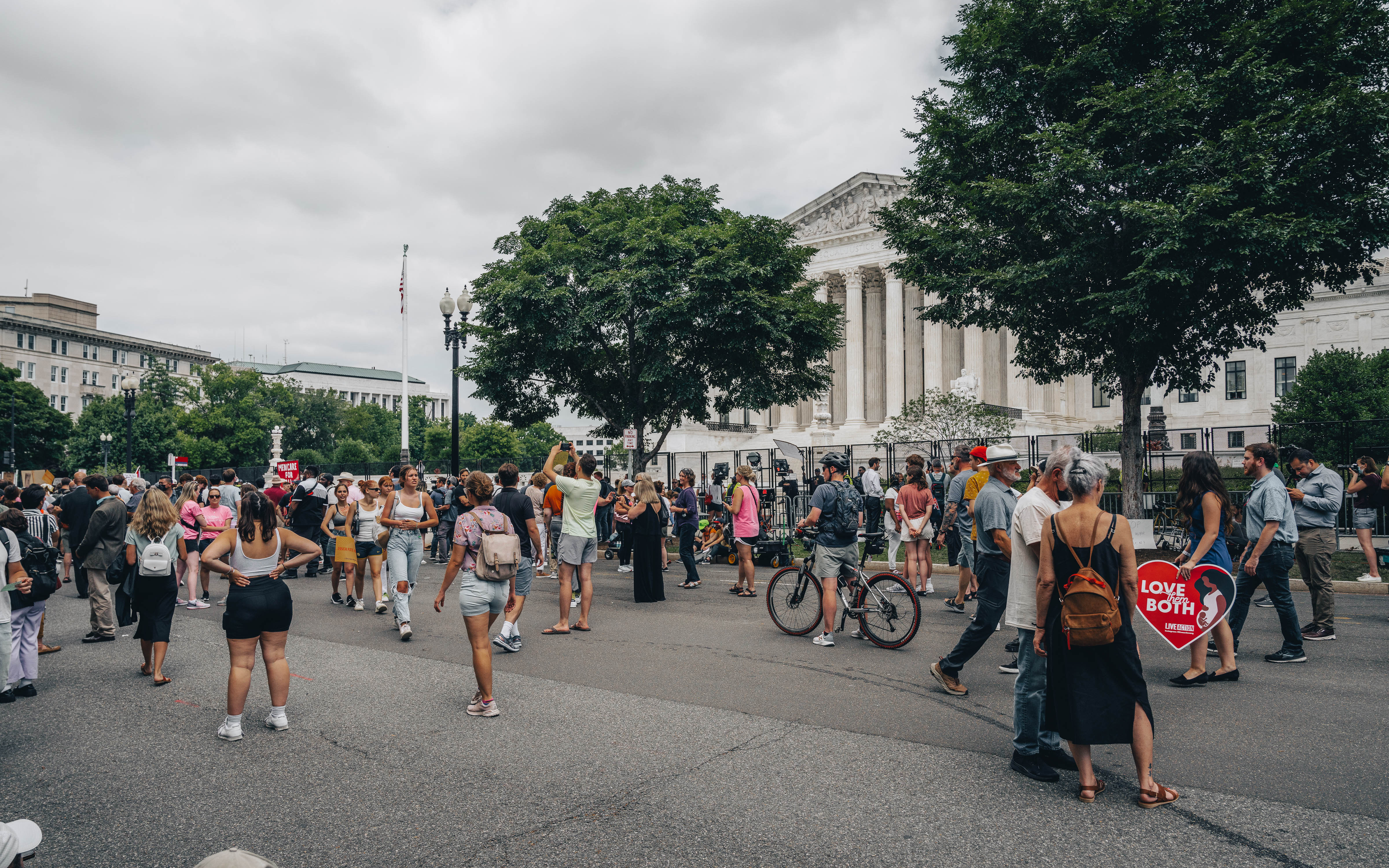
Protestors outside of the Supreme Court, hours after the announcement of Dobbs

=== 2022 ===
On June 24, 2022, anti-abortion and pro-abortion rights activists demonstrated outside the Supreme Court building following the decision to overturn Roe and Casey. By noon, there was a major police presence around the Supreme Court building and the Capitol building, including police with riot gear, and police squad cars and SUVs. Multiple streets were barricaded by police.

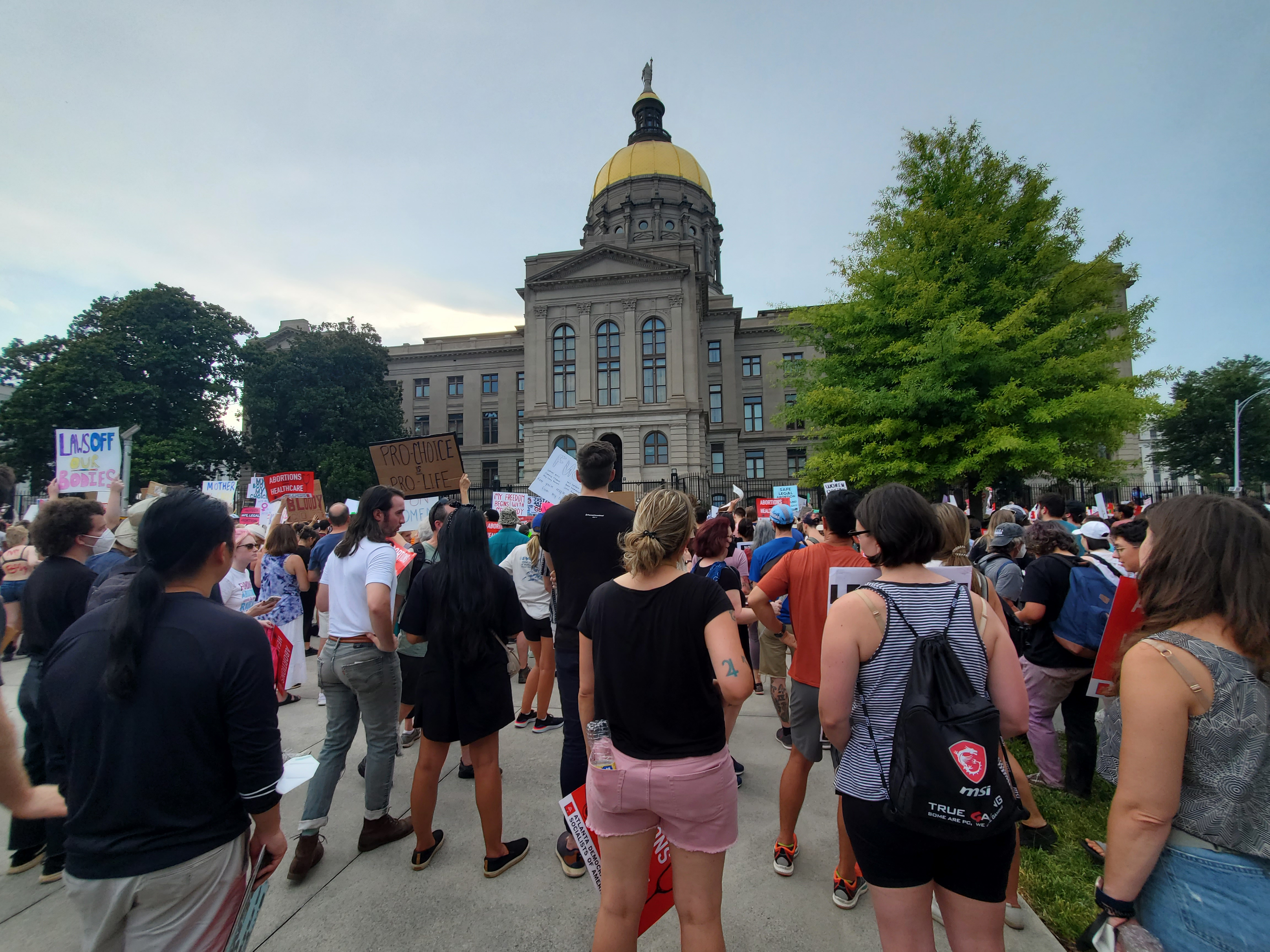
Protests outside of the Georgia State Capitol in Atlanta, June 24

Protests also occurred in cities and towns across the country, drawing large crowds of demonstrators, with many activists calling for more action from Democratic lawmakers.

On June 30, more than 180 abortion rights protesters were arrested in Washington, D.C. after sitting and blocking an intersection near the Supreme Court.

On July 4, abortion rights protests were held across the country, including Washington, D.C., New York City, Philadelphia, Boston, Los Angeles, Sacramento, San Francisco, San Diego, Portland, Seattle, Chicago, Minneapolis, Kansas City, Springfield, Madison, Milwaukee, Lansing, Detroit, Bloomington, Columbus, Cleveland, Cincinnati, Denver, Charlotte, Asheville, Atlanta, Roanoke, Birmingham, Tampa, Miami, Las Vegas, Albuquerque, Salt Lake City, San Antonio, Austin, and Houston.

On July 9, another day of abortion rights protests occurred in cities across the country, with over 10,000 people marching in Washington, D.C.

On July 19, 35 abortion rights protesters including 17 members of Congress were arrested in Washington, D.C. after blocking an intersection near the Supreme Court.

On August 2, Kansas became the first state in the country to vote on abortion rights after the overturn of Roe v. Wade, rejecting an amendment that would have removed abortion rights from the state constitution.

On October 8, thousands of people marched and rallied in abortion rights protests in cities across the country, in conjunction with the Women's March in Washington, D.C.

On November 2, three abortion rights protesters were arrested in Washington, D.C. after interrupting arguments during a Supreme Court session.

In the 2022 United States elections, three states (California, Michigan and Vermont) voted to codify abortion and contraception rights into their state constitutions, and two states voted against state constitution amendments that would have banned and criminalized abortion (Kentucky and Montana).

=== 2023 ===
On January 20, abortion rights protesters disrupted an anti-abortion service in Washington, D.C.

On January 22, to mark the 50th anniversary of Roe v. Wade, thousands of abortion rights protesters rallied and marched at more than 200 Women's March events in 46 states.

On April 8, following Texas federal judge Matthew Kacsmaryk's decision to withdraw federal approval of the drug mifepristone, abortion rights protests were held in Atlanta, Austin, Boston, Chicago, Cleveland, Detroit, Honolulu, Houston, Los Angeles, Madison, Wisconsin, New York City, Philadelphia, Seattle and Washington DC.

On April 15, thousands of abortion rights protesters rallied and marched nationwide in response to the mifepristone decision. On April 21, the Supreme Court left the FDA approval of mifepristone in place while legal proceedings continue.

On June 24, the one year anniversary of Roe v. Wade being overturned, thousands of abortion rights protesters rallied and marched at hundreds of events across the United States.

On September 12, women and doctors in Idaho, Oklahoma and Tennessee filed lawsuits against their states over the states' abortion bans, stating that they were denied abortions despite having dangerous pregnancy complications.

In the 2023 United States elections, Ohio voters passed November 2023 Ohio Issue 1, enshrining abortion and contraception rights into the state constitution. In Virginia, Democrats retook full control of the General Assembly after campaigning on abortion rights following Governor Glenn Youngkin's promise to institute a 15-week abortion ban in the state if the Republicans gained a majority.

=== 2024 ===
On January 20, thousands of abortion rights protesters rallied and marched at more than 100 Women's March events nationwide, with the main events held in Phoenix, Arizona and Washington, DC.

On March 26, hundreds of abortion rights protesters rallied and marched in Washington, DC as the Supreme Court heard oral arguments on whether or not to limit access to mifepristone. 13 abortion rights protesters were arrested for blocking an intersection near the Supreme Court.

On June 22–24, the second anniversary of Roe v. Wade being overturned, thousands of abortion rights protesters rallied and marched at over 250 events across the United States.

On September 14, about 2,000 people participated in the first Gender Liberation March in Washington, DC, which united abortion rights protesters and transgender rights protesters.

On November 2, thousands of abortion rights protesters rallied and marched at Women's March events nationwide, with the main event held in Washington, DC, where over 15,000 people marched.

In the 2024 United States elections, abortion referendums were on the ballot in 10 states: Arizona, Colorado, Florida, Maryland, Missouri, Montana, Nebraska, Nevada, New York and South Dakota. Abortion rights ballot measures won in 7 out of the 10 states where they were put to a vote.

On November 9, hundreds of abortion rights protesters rallied at a Women's March protest outside of the Heritage Foundation headquarters in Washington, DC.

On December 10, several people were arrested during a protest to ratify the Equal Rights Amendment in Washington, DC.

=== 2025 ===
On January 10, 7 people were arrested during a protest to ratify the Equal Rights Amendment outside of the National Archives and Records Administration in Washington, DC.

On January 18, thousands participated in the People's March nationwide in over 350 events across the country, with over 25,000 people marching in Washington, DC.

On February 5, anti-Trump administration protests called "50 protests in 50 states", or "The 50501 Movement", were held in state capitols across the country. Additional 50501 Movement protests were held in state capitols and major cities nationwide on February 17, March 4 and April 19.

On March 8, thousands of abortion rights protesters marched in over 300 demonstrations nationwide on International Women's Day.

On April 2, an abortion rights protest was held outside of the United States Supreme Court Building in Washington, DC concerning a case that would determine the ability of states to end Medicaid funding for organizations that provide abortions.

On April 5, millions of people in the United States, Canada and Europe participated in the Hands Off protest.

On June 14, millions of people in the United States and 20 other countries participated in the No Kings protests, the third largest protest in United States history to date.

On October 18, between 6-7 million people participated in the second No Kings protests, the second largest protest in United States history to date.

=== 2026 ===
On March 28, approximately 8-9 million people participated in the third No Kings protests, the largest protest in United States history to date.

In the 2026 United States elections, two states (Nevada and Virginia) voted to codify abortion and contraception rights into their state constitutions, and Missouri voters rejected a proposed amendment to remove abortion rights from the state constitution.

=== Midwest ===
Protestors in Columbus, Ohio

==== 2022 ====
Illinois saw a protest in Chicago on June 24 with ABC 7 News counting thousands marching to Grant Park, and a few dozen anti-abortion activists in Federal Plaza. Among those in attendance included Governor J. B. Pritzker. Additional protests and marches were held in downtown Chicago the following day. Another protest was held in downtown Naperville; ABC 7 News counted several hundred protesters. On June 26, a group of abortion rights protesters disrupted a Catholic Mass in Old Town, Chicago. On July 9, hundreds of abortion rights protesters and anti-abortion protesters clashed in Chicago's Federal Plaza and marched downtown. On August 24, two anti-abortion protesters vandalized an abortion-rights church in the Lake View, Chicago neighborhood on Chicago's north side.

In Indiana, a rally was held at Indianapolis's Monument Circle on the evening of June 24. On June 25, more than 1,000 abortion-rights and 200 anti-abortion demonstrators descended on the Indiana Statehouse. Demonstrations were also reported in Bloomington, Evansville, Fort Wayne,Lafayette, and South Bend. On July 25, The Indianapolis Star counted over 1,000 abortion rights protesters and about 60 anti-abortion activists rallying at the Indiana Statehouse in Indianapolis.

Iowa saw protests in Des Moines and Cedar Rapids. During a protest in Cedar Rapids near the U.S. District Court Federal Court House, a truck ran over a woman's foot. The driver of the truck was later arrested and charged with assault. On July 22, an anti-abortion rights man was arrested after assaulting a group of abortion rights protesters in McGregor.

In Topeka, Kansas, protesters gathered outside the Kansas State Capitol.

Michigan saw peaceful protests in Ann Arbor and Detroit with Click on Detroit counting nearly 1,000 participants. Around 200 demonstrated at the Michigan State Capitol in Lansing. Protests were also held in Grand Rapids and Kalamazoo.

In Minnesota, anti-abortion and pro-abortion rights events were held in Minneapolis and Saint Paul. A protest was held in St. Cloud at the Stearns County Courthouse.

In Missouri, a protest was held at the Mill Creek Park in Kansas City, where KSHB counted hundreds of protestors. Another protest occurred a week later, with over 1,000 abortion rights protesters gathering and marching in Kansas City. On July 10, a group of protestors marched onto Interstate 64 in downtown St. Louis. On July 27, a group of abortion rights protesters infiltrated an anti-abortion fundraiser at Lambert Airport in St. Louis.

Hundreds protested on June 24 in Memorial Park in Omaha, Nebraska.

In North Dakota, over 1,000 abortion rights protesters rallied and marched in Fargo and Grand Forks.

In Ohio hundreds of protesters gathered at the Ohio State Capitol in Columbus. Other protests were held in Akron,Bowling Green, Cincinnati, and Cleveland. On July 10, a group of abortion rights protesters in Cleveland camped out in front of City Hall for a week.

In South Dakota, six people were arrested on June 29 following an abortion rights protest in Sioux Falls. On July 9–10, hundreds of abortion rights protesters rallied and marched in Sioux Falls and Rapid City. On July 23, about 100 abortion rights protesters rallied and marched at the South Dakota State Capitol in Pierre. Abortion rights protests were also held at the University of South Dakota in Vermillion.

In Wisconsin, thousands of protesters gathered and marched in Madison, Milwaukee, Appleton, Eau Claire, Kenosha, Wausau, Marshfield, Stevens Point, Sheboygan, La Crosse and Green Bay.

==== 2023 ====
In Peoria, Illinois on January 15, an anti-abortion protester threw a fire accelerant at a window of a Planned Parenthood, causing a fire and an estimated $150,000 in damages. On January 22, abortion rights protesters rallied to support the clinic in response to the attack. The anti-abortion protestor was arrested on federal arson-related charges on January 24. He was later sentenced to 10 years in prison. In Chicago on April 9, Easter Sunday, a group of abortion rights protesters dressed as handmaids protested outside of Holy Name Cathedral, Chicago. In Danville, Illinois on May 20, an anti-abortion protester was arrested and charged with attempted arson after ramming his vehicle filled with containers of gasoline into a prospective abortion clinic, just weeks after hundreds of abortion rights protesters had rallied in opposition to a proposed local ordinance banning abortion pills, which are legal in Illinois per the Reproductive Health Care Act. He was later sentenced to 5 years in prison. In Chicago on July 15 and September 28, dozens of abortion rights protesters rallied against "crisis pregnancy centers". In Evanston, Illinois on October 15, 2023, an abortion rights protest and march was held. In McHenry, Illinois on October 28, a group of abortion rights protesters rallied against "crisis pregnancy centers".

In Indiana on July 30–31, hundreds of abortion rights protesters rallied across the state in opposition to the state's near-total abortion ban. In Indianapolis on November 14, the Russian feminist performance art group Pussy Riot held a demonstration against Indiana's near-total abortion ban on the steps of the Indiana state supreme court.

In Des Moines, Iowa on July 11–12, a crowd of abortion rights protesters rallied as the Iowa state legislature passed a 6-week abortion ban, just weeks after a similar ban was struck down by the Iowa Supreme Court. Several abortion rights protesters were escorted out of the gallery by police after heckling the legislature.

In St. Louis, Missouri, on January 19, a group of religious leaders who support abortion rights held a march downtown and filed a lawsuit challenging Missouri's abortion ban, saying lawmakers openly invoked their religious beliefs while drafting the measure and thereby imposed those beliefs on others who don't share them, in violation of the Missouri state constitution.

In Lincoln, Nebraska on February 1, about 300 abortion rights protesters rallied against a proposed abortion ban at the Nebraska State Capitol. On May 19, 6 people were arrested after abortion rights and LGBTQ rights protesters flooded the Nebraska State Capitol following the state legislature's passing of a bill banning abortion after 12 weeks and banning gender-affirming care for minors.

In Kent, Ohio on April 25, dozens of abortion rights protesters clashed with anti-abortion protesters at Kent State University. In Columbus, Ohio on May 3, hundreds of protesters marched around the Ohio Statehouse to protest August 2023 Ohio Issue 1, the Republican-backed resolution to require 60% voter approval to amend the Ohio state constitution to be voted on in August 2023, three months before a proposed abortion rights amendment on the ballot would take place in the Ohio November 2023 elections. On October 8, abortion rights protests in support of November 2023 Ohio Issue 1 were held in Columbus, Ohio, Cincinnati, Cleveland, Toledo, Ohio, Dayton and Akron. In Milford, Ohio on October 19, at least half a dozen workers at a restaurant quit after the owner posted a sign outside the business encouraging people to vote no on November 2023 Ohio Issue 1, forcing the restaurant to temporarily close. In Cleveland on November 4, Women's March Cleveland held a rally in support of November 2023 Ohio Issue 1 at Cleveland City Hall.

In Spearfish, South Dakota on April 20, an abortion rights protest and petition signing event was held in Black Hills State University.

==== 2024 ====
In Madison, Wisconsin on January 27, an abortion rights protest was held outside the state capitol building following Republican efforts to pass a bill on a 14-week abortion ban referendum.

In Chicago on March 26, a group of abortion rights protesters rallied outside the federal courthouse downtown in support of preserving access to mifepristone.

In Des Moines, Iowa on April 11, an abortion rights protest was held outside the state courthouse while the Iowa Supreme Court heard oral arguments on a proposed 6-week abortion ban.

In Indianapolis, Indiana and Hobart, Indiana on June 24, abortion rights protests were held on the second anniversary of the overturning of Roe v. Wade.

In Cedar Rapids, Iowa on June 29, an abortion rights protest was held following the Iowa Supreme Court's ruling to uphold a 6-week abortion ban.

In Milwaukee, Wisconsin on July 15, over 3,000 people protested Trump and Republican policies outside the Republican National Convention.

In Chicago on August 18, hundreds of protesters rallied and marched for abortion rights, LGBTQ rights and a ceasefire to the Gaza war outside of the Democratic National Convention.

On August 22, an abortion rights and gun safety rally was held in Leawood, Kansas.

In Evansville, Indiana on September 12, an abortion rights protest was held outside of a plaza where an anti-abortion banquet was taking place.

In Chicago on September 26, a group of abortion rights protesters rallied outside of an anti-abortion banquet benefiting "crisis pregnancy centers".

In Chicago on November 6, hundreds attended an anti-Trump rally.

==== 2025 ====
In Pecatonica, Illinois on February 28, an abortion rights protest was held to oppose Representative Tony McCombie's reintroduction of a bill that would repeal the Reproductive Health Act and ban abortion in Illinois.

In Jefferson City, Missouri on May 15, hundreds of people protested at the state capitol building regarding Missouri state Republicans' passing two bills seeking to overturn ballot initiatives for ending the state's abortion ban and enacting a paid sick leave law that were passed the previous November.

=== Northeast ===
==== 2022 ====
Thousands protested in New Haven, Connecticut on June 24. On the same day over a hundred protesters gathered in downtown Stamford and the New Milford Town Green.

In Maine, Bangor Daily News counted over a thousand protesters gathered in Portland in front of Portland City Hall, with a counter protest of unknown size. On June 30, hundreds of abortion rights protestors gathered in Lewiston.

In Maryland protests were held in Annapolis and Baltimore.

In Massachusetts, WBUR counted over 1,000 protestors marching in Boston near the Boston Public Library. Over 100 protesters gathered outside Worcester City Hall and began chanting. On October 15 in Boston, an abortion rights "Clown March" protest was held to counterprotest an anti-abortion "Men's March".

In New Jersey, protests in Teaneck, Morristown and South Orange were held on June 24. On June 26, protests continued for a third day in Fair Lawn, Jersey City and Hoboken. A rally supporting the decision was held outside the Statehouse Annex in Trenton was organized by New Jersey Right to Life.

In New Hampshire, hundreds of abortion rights protesters rallied and marched in Manchester, Exeter, Keene and Portsmouth.

AM New York Metro estimated that 17,000 protesters gathered in Washington Square Park in New York City to demonstrate against the ruling, with thousands more in Union Square. Others were spread throughout Grand Central Station, Bryant Park, and city streets. On July 7, an anti-abortion protester was charged with disorderly conduct for allegedly preventing access to a clinic in Hempstead, and an abortion rights rally in support of the clinic was held on July 21 in Mineola. On August 18, two anti-abortion protesters were arrested in Brooklyn after harassing employees and patients inside a clinic. On December 3, seven people were arrested when anti-abortion protesters clashed with abortion rights protesters outside of a clinic in Manhattan.

In Pennsylvania protests were held in Erie, Lancaster, Philadelphia, and Pittsburgh.

A protest was held outside the Rhode Island State Capitol on June 24. The Providence Police Department stated they were investigating an officer running for Rhode Island State Senate after he allegedly assaulted a political opponent during the protest while off-duty.

Protests were held in multiple cities in Vermont, including Bennington, Brattleboro, Burlington, Montpelier and Rutland, Vermont.

==== 2023 ====
In Chevy Chase, Maryland on January 22, abortion rights protesters rallied outside of Brett Kavanaugh's home after a documentary investigating his sexual assault allegations premiered at the Sundance Film Festival.

On February 4, anti-abortion protesters clashed with abortion rights protesters outside of a clinic in Manhattan. On May 6, four people were arrested after anti-abortion protesters clashed with abortion rights protesters outside of St. Patrick's Old Cathedral in Manhattan.

In Philadelphia on March 8, dozens of abortion rights protesters marched on International Women's Day, advocating for abortion rights in the United States and women's rights in Iran and Afghanistan.

In Boston on November 4, an abortion rights "Clown March" protest was held to counterprotest an anti-abortion "Men's March".

==== 2024 ====
On March 23, 7 people were arrested during an abortion rights counterprotest of an anti-abortion march in Manhattan.

On September 28, a rally and vigil for Amber Thurman and Candi Miller was held in Washington Square Park in Manhattan.

On November 8 and 9, anti-Trump rallies were held in Manhattan, Philadelphia and Pittsburgh.

On November 16, 9 people were arrested in Boston when an annual abortion rights "Clown March" protest was held to counterprotest an anti-abortion "Men's March".

=== South ===
==== 2022 ====
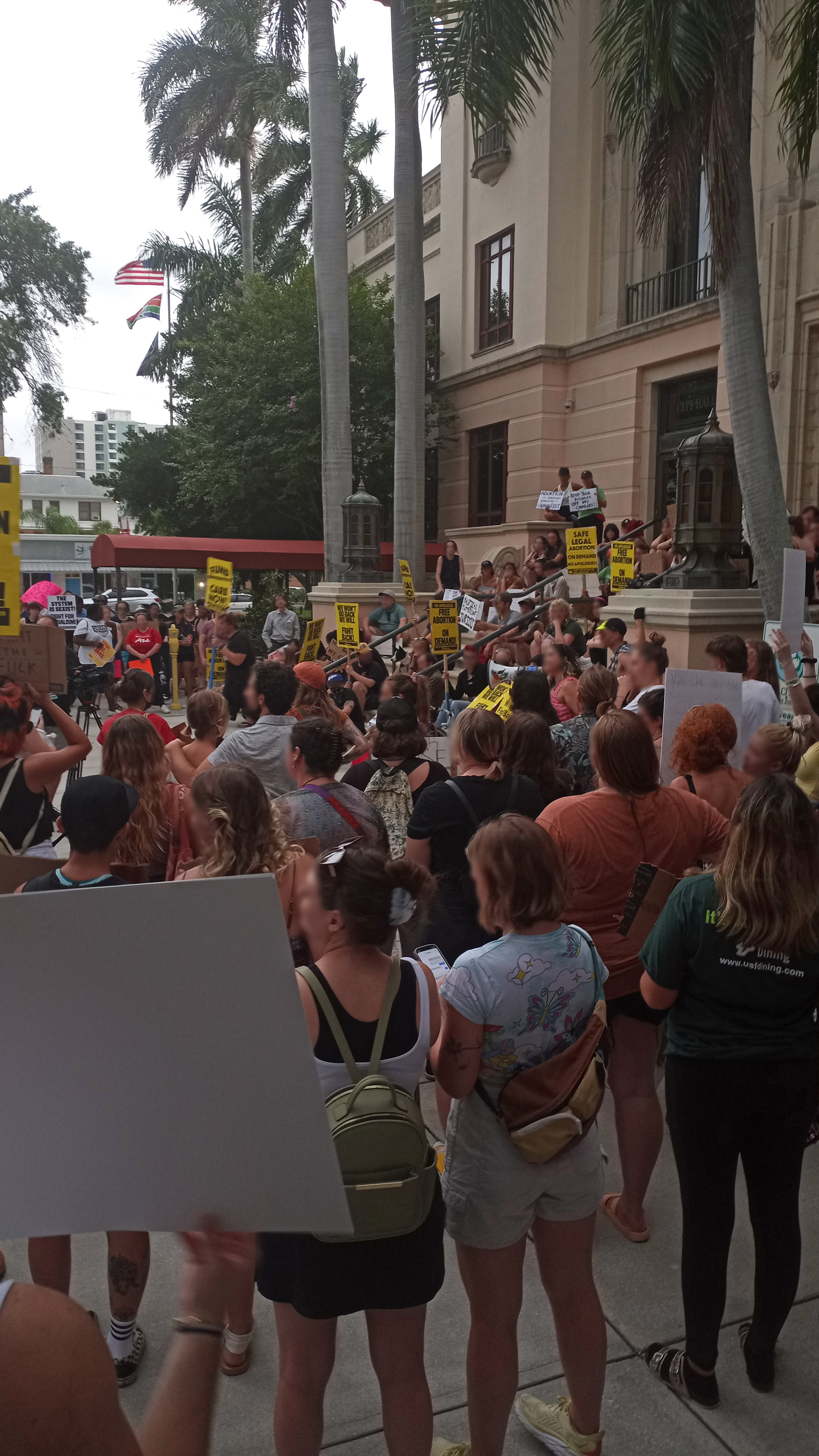
Protest in St. Petersburg, Florida

In Alabama protesters marched from the Alabama Department of Archives and History to the Alabama State Capitol in Montgomery on June 26. Protests were also held in Birmingham, Huntsville, and Mobile.

Around 200 protesters gathered outside the Arkansas State Capitol in Little Rock.

In Florida protests were held outside the Florida State Capitol in Tallahassee, the Wynwood neighborhood of Miami, Tampa, and St. Petersburg. On August 22, a clinic in Jacksonville notified the FBI after 165 anti-abortion protesters blocked the entrance to their clinic in violation of the FACE Act.

In Georgia, hundreds of abortion rights protestors gathered in Atlanta. A group of abortion rights protestors stayed on the Georgia State Capitol steps for over a week following the protests.

In Louisiana, hundreds of protesters gathered in New Orleans, marching from Lafayette Square to City Hall, while anti-abortion activists gathered to celebrate the decision. On June 30, abortion rights protesters rallied at the Louisiana State Capitol in Baton Rouge before marching to the governor's mansion.

Hundreds turned out to protest in various cities in North Carolina, including Charlotte, Asheville, Raleigh, and Wilmington.

In South Carolina, a protest was held on June 25 in Greenville.

In Nashville, Tennessee, hundreds gathered at the Legislative Plaza on June 24. Protesters also gathered along Poplar Avenue in Memphis, as well as Founder's Park in Johnson City. On August 2, a Tennessee federal judge issued a restraining order against anti-abortion group Operation Save America after several of their members were arrested during protests at clinics in Nashville, Tennessee and Mt. Juliet in late July. On September 26, an abortion rights protester began walking across the entire state of Tennessee, a 538-mile walk, to protest the state Supreme Court's decision to overturn abortion rights.

In Kentucky, protests were held in Louisville, Lexington, Frankfort, Bowling Green and Covington.

In Mississippi, protests were held in Jackson, Gulfport, and Hattiesburg.

In Oklahoma, hundreds of protesters rallied and marched in Oklahoma City, Tulsa, Talequah, and Bartlesville.

Texas saw protests in Austin, Dallas, Denton, Houston, and San Antonio.

In Virginia, hundreds protested at Lafayette Park in Norfolk, and in Richmond hundreds marched from the Federal Court building to City Hall chanting protests.

In West Virginia, hundreds of protesters gathered in Charleston, Huntington, Fairmont, and Shepherdstown. Abortion rights protesters gathered and rallied at the West Virginia State Capitol for several days in July and August. On September 13, more than a dozen abortion rights protesters were forcibly removed from the West Virginia statehouse after lawmakers passed a near-total ban on abortion.

==== 2023 ====
In Tallahassee, Florida in March and April, several abortion rights protests were held at the Florida State Capitol in opposition to a proposed six-week abortion ban. On April 3, 13 abortion rights protesters including two state senators were arrested following a peaceful protest outside City Hall. On May 3, 14 people were arrested following a sit-in in Ron DeSantis' office to protest Florida's six-week abortion ban, anti-LGBTQ legislation and anti-immigrant legislation.

In Atlanta, Georgia in October, abortion rights protesters marched in the Atlanta Pride Parade and the Little Five Points Halloween Parade.

In Raleigh, North Carolina on May 3, hundreds of abortion rights protesters rallied at the North Carolina state legislature in opposition to a proposed 12-week abortion ban that was rushed through the legislature in less than 24 hours. On May 13, hundreds of abortion rights protesters rallied in Raleigh as Governor Roy Cooper vetoed the 12-week abortion ban. On May 16, abortion rights protests continued after the North Carolina state legislature overrode the governor's veto and passed a 12-week abortion ban.

In Greenville, South Carolina on February 23, anti-abortion protesters physically clashed with abortion rights protesters outside of a clinic. Due to this physical confrontation and over 300 others since the beginning of 2021 that led to 20 arrests at the clinic, in October 2023 the Greenville County Council's Public Safety Committee voted to prohibit firearms, weapons, body armor, open flames, bicycles and the blocking of pedestrian walkways and entrances to businesses at protests. In Columbia, South Carolina on May 15, a group of abortion rights protesters rallied at the South Carolina statehouse in opposition to the state's 6-week abortion ban.

In Texas on March 7, five women who suffered serious pregnancy complications and were denied abortions sued the state of Texas over their near-total abortion ban, stating that the ban directly put their lives and health in danger. As of May 22, eight additional Texas women who had been denied abortions despite severe pregnancy complications joined the lawsuit.

In Richmond, Virginia on March 29, two people were arrested after a physical fight broke out between anti-abortion protesters and abortion rights protesters at Virginia Commonwealth University.

==== 2024 ====
In February, Allie Phillips announced that she was running for a Tennessee House seat in District 75 following being forced to leave the state to get an abortion in New York for a non-viable pregnancy.

In Little Rock, Arkansas on March 10, several hundred abortion rights protesters rallied at the state capitol building in support of the petition for an Arkansas abortion amendment to end the abortion ban in the state.

In Orlando, Florida on April 13, over 1,000 abortion rights protesters rallied and marched to kick off the campaign in support of 2024 Florida Amendment 4.

In Bentonville, Arkansas on May 11, abortion rights protesters and anti-abortion protesters staged dueling protests at the Bentonville Square.

In June, Texas radio host Ryan Hamilton spoke out against Texas' abortion ban after his wife nearly bled to death when a Texas hospital refused to treat her miscarriage.

In Atlanta, Georgia on September 21 and September 28, rallies and vigils for Amber Thurman and Candi Miller were held outside of the Georgia Supreme Court and the Georgia Capitol Building, to demand the repeal of Georgia's 6-week abortion ban and the legalization of abortion nationwide.

==== 2025 ====
In Austin, Texas on August 22, over 100 protesters rallied at the Capitol Building to protest Texas Senate Bill 8, an anti-transgender bill restricting bathroom use in government buildings; and Texas House Bill 7, which places even further restrictions on mifepristone.

In Columbia, South Carolina on October 1, protesters rallied and spoke out against Bill S.323, which would have banned abortion in the state with almost no exceptions, banned some forms of birth control such as IUD's and emergency contraception, banned IVF and sought homicide charges and the death penalty for anyone who obtained an abortion. The bill failed to advance out of subcommittee, following statewide and nationwide backlash.

=== West ===
==== 2022 ====
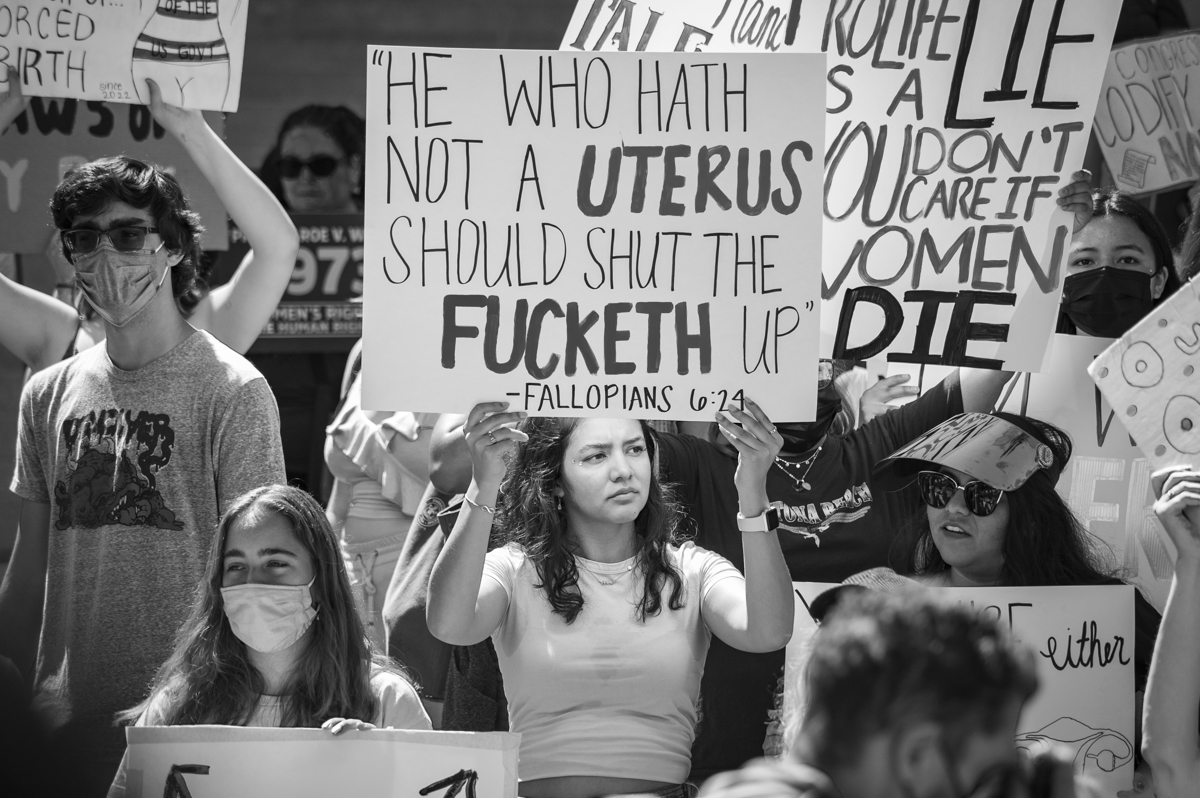
Pro-choice protest in Los Angeles

California saw protests in multiple cities in the Bay Area, including Oakland, San Jose, San Mateo, and San Francisco. Los Angeles saw protests in both Downtown and Hollywood. Other protests occurred in San Luis Obispo and the California State Capitol in Sacramento. On June 25, former child actress Jodie Sweetin (Full House) was thrown to the ground by police while protesting on a ramp of the 101 Freeway in Los Angeles. On July 28, two veterans were arrested in Los Angeles after chaining themselves to a lamppost in support of abortion rights. On July 30, 13 people were arrested and 8 people charged with vandalism following an abortion rights protest in Riverside. On August 27, several people were arrested after anti-abortion protesters clashed with abortion rights protesters at a Straight pride rally in Modesto. On September 3, three people were arrested after anti-abortion protesters clashed with abortion rights protesters in Hollywood.

In San Diego County, protestors attended a candlelight vigil in Waterfront Park; others marched through downtown San Diego on June 24. The Times of San Diego counted up to 200 more protesting on June 25. Dozens protested outside Escondido City Hall in San Diego County. Santee saw a protest on June 27.

A protest was held outside the Colorado State Capitol in Denver.

A protest was held in Boise, Idaho outside city hall.

In Montana, several protests and marches were held across the state in late June and early July, including in the state capital of Helena where more than a thousand protestors gathered. Other protests were held in Bozeman, Missoula, Billings, and Great Falls.

In Nevada, hundreds of abortion rights protestors rallied at the U.S. District Courthouse in Reno on June 24 and over the weekend. Hundreds of abortion rights protestors also rallied at the U.S. Courthouse in Las Vegas on June 24.

In New Mexico, hundreds of abortion rights protesters rallied in Albuquerque.

KGW counted at least 2,000 who gathered for a protest in Downtown Portland, Oregon. 10 people were arrested at a June 24 protest in Eugene.

Protesters demonstrated outside the Utah State Capitol in Salt Lake City on June 24. Protests were also held in Provo on June 25.

In Wyoming, dozens of abortion rights protestors rallied and marched outside the state's only clinic offering abortion services in Casper.

In Washington, thousands of people protested in Spokane, Westland Park and Downtown Seattle.

==== 2023 ====
In Santa Monica, California on May 13, anti-abortion protesters clashed with abortion rights protesters and the two groups were physically separated by police.

==== 2024 ====
On October 12, an abortion rights protest supporting 2024 Montana Initiative 128 was held in Helena, Montana at the Montana State Capitol.

On November 7, 8 and 9, hundreds attended anti-Trump rallies in Denver, Seattle and Portland, Oregon.

==== 2025 ====
On June 28, hundreds of people attended a rally at the state capitol in Boise, Idaho to kick off a signature gathering campaign for a ballot initiative to end Idaho's abortion ban.

==== 2026 ====
On April 14, Idahoans United for Women and Families stated that they had gathered close to 100,000 signatures for a proposed ballot initiative to end Idaho's abortion ban.

==== Arizona ====
===== 2022 =====
Protests began in Phoenix around 7:00 p.m. MST June 24 in response to the overturning of Roe v. Wade. Demonstrations moved to the Arizona State Capitol, with it being mostly peaceful. Protestors began banging on the building around 8:30 pm, prompting an evacuation of lawmakers and staff, which led to SWAT officers being deployed around the building. The protests were later called "an insurrection aimed at overthrowing the state government" by Republican Senate President Karen Fann; the Arizona Department of Public Safety fired tear gas when protestors attempted to break into the building. On June 25 a smaller number of people protested, with four people arrested on suspicion of rioting and disorderly conduct, including an identified member of the National Lawyers Guild Legal observer. Protestors marched through Phoenix again on July 1.

===== 2024 =====
On January 20, hundreds of abortion rights protesters rallied and marched at the main event for the Women's March held in Phoenix, Arizona.

On April 9, an abortion rights protest was held in Phoenix following the Arizona Supreme Court's decision to allow a near-total abortion ban from 1864 to take effect.

On April 11, Democrats in the Arizona state senate began chanting "Shame! Shame! Shame on you!" following the Republicans' decision to block an effort by Democrats to repeal the 1864 ban.

On April 17, hundreds of abortion rights protesters rallied outside of the Arizona State Capitol in Phoenix.

On June 8, Vote For Abortion kicked off its campaign with a bus tour across Phoenix, ending with a rally outside of the Arizona State House.

=== Outside the United States ===
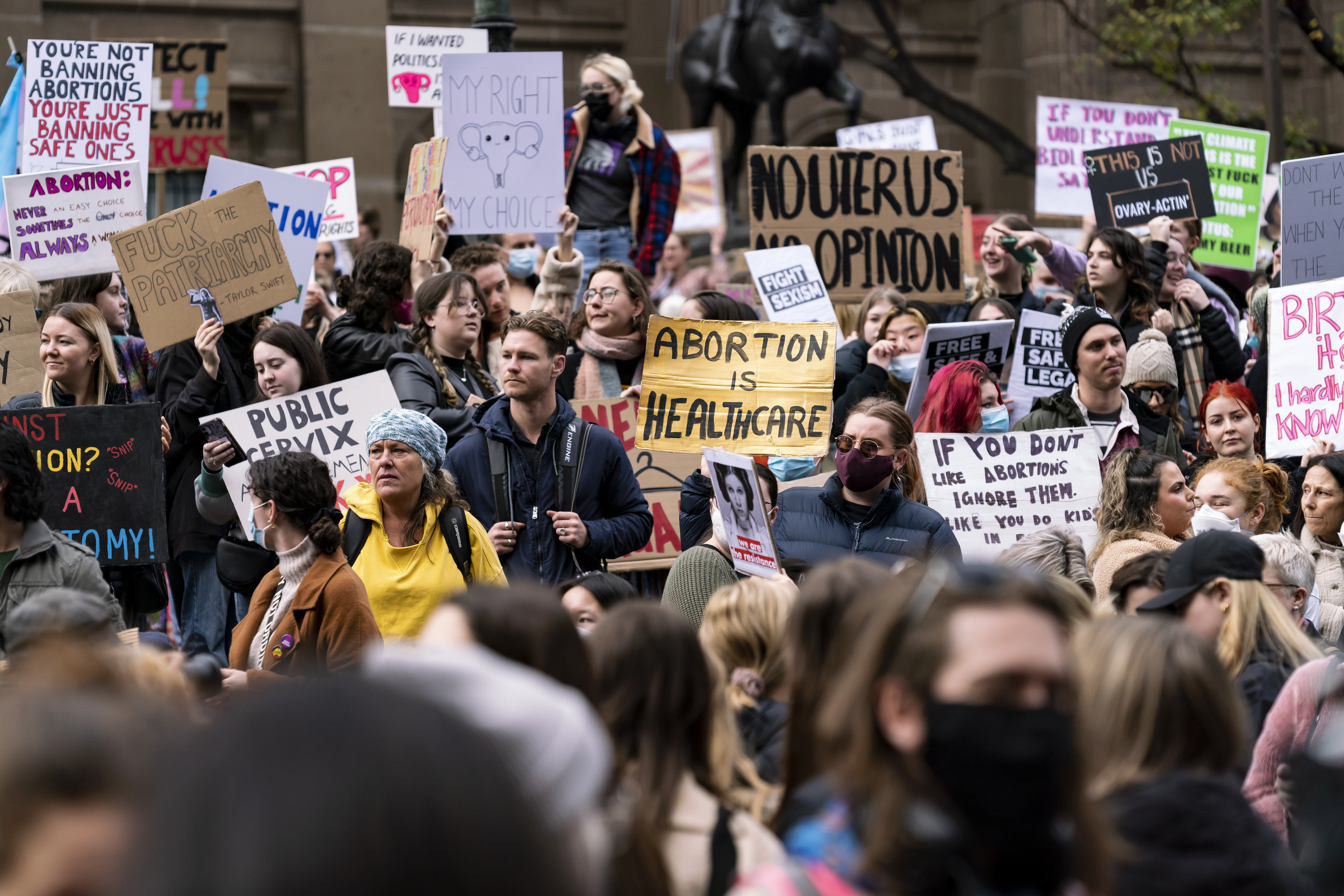
An abortion rights protest in Melbourne on July 2, 2022

Protests supporting the ruling have been held in the United Kingdom and Ireland.

Protests against the ruling were held in Germany, Argentina, Mexico, France, the United Kingdom, Australia, Canada, and Ireland.

On March 4, 2024, France became the first country in the world to enshrine abortion rights into the country's constitution. This was in direct response to the overturn of Roe v. Wade in the United States.

On June 16, 2026, Luxembourg enshrined abortion rights into the country's constitution, in response to the overturn of Roe v. Wade.

On November 11, 2026, Sweden enshrined abortion rights into the country's constitution.

== See also ==
- Abortion in the United States
- United States abortion rights movement
- Timeline of protests against Donald Trump
- List of incidents of civil unrest in the United States
- 2020-2021 women's strike protests in Poland
- Mahsa Amini protests
