= Georgia House Bill 481 =

Bill in the U.S. state of Georgia banning abortions after six weeks

Georgia General Assembly
- Long title: Living Infants Fairness and Equality (LIFE) Act
- Passed: April 4, 2019
- Signed by: Brian Kemp
- Signed: May 7, 2019

Legislative history
- Bill title: House Bill 481
- First reading: February 26, 2019
- Second reading: February 27, 2019
- Third reading: March 7, 2019

Summary
- Banning abortion beyond fetal heartbeat
- Status: In force

The Georgia House Bill 481, formally named the Living Infants Fairness and Equality (LIFE) Act, is an American anti-abortion law passed in 2019 that sought to prevent physicians in the U.S. state of Georgia from performing abortions beyond six weeks, except in special situations. The bill was strongly criticized and, notably, many celebrities in Hollywood threatened to boycott the state of Georgia if it were passed. Passed in 2019, it was initially ruled unconstitutional in July 2020. That ruling was reversed, however, in July 2022.

In September 2024, a Fulton County Superior Court Judge struck down HB 481 arguing it violated Georgia's Constitution. After the state appealed to the Supreme Court of Georgia, the law was reinstated.

== Overview ==
=== Provisions ===
The Georgia HB 481 is a six-week abortion ban; except in certain situations, physicians practicing medicine in the state of Georgia would be prohibited from offering abortion services to pregnant women if a "fetal heartbeat" is present, which typically occurs in the 6th week of pregnancy. Exceptions are provided for women whose pregnancies are considered futile (e.g. anencephaly) or medical emergency and women pregnant by rape or incest but only if they are less than 20 weeks pregnant and only if they have filed a police report.

=== Supporters ===
The bill was sponsored by Rep. Ed Setzler, Rep. Jodi Lott, Rep. Darlene Taylor, Rep. Josh Bonner, Rep. Ginny Ehrhart, Rep. Micah Gravley, and Sen. Renee Unterman, all members of the Republican Party.

Proponents of the bill compare the rights of fetuses to those of slaves liberated under the Fourteenth Amendment and LGBT people.

=== Similar bills ===
South Carolina introduced a similar prohibitive bill in 2019, H.3020, which passed the South Carolina House of Representatives in a 71 to 30 vote. The Post and Courier reported that despite passing, it was unlikely the bill would be signed into law. Mississippi (Senate Bill 2116) and Kentucky had passed similar measures in 2019, both of which are being subjected to legal backlash.

== Response ==
Governor Brian Kemp of Georgia voiced his support for the bill, calling it "common sense". Georgia state senator Jen Jordan opposed it, objecting to the wording of the legislation: a woman would have only 1 to 2 weeks to realize she had missed a menstrual period and schedule an abortion, in order to stay within the time frame allotted by the bill. Kemp signed the bill on May 7, 2019.

=== Hollywood boycott ===
More than fifty high profile individuals in the U.S. entertainment industry, ranging from actors to screenwriters to directors, issued an official statement threatening to boycott the state of Georgia if the bill is passed. Additionally, Writers Guild of America West and Writers Guild of America East issued a joint statement saying their members would also boycott the state. Such a boycott could have had a devastating effect on Georgia's economy, as the state, especially the capital city of Atlanta, serves as the filming location for many high budget films and television shows, including The Walking Dead, Stranger Things, The Real Housewives of Atlanta, Love & Hip Hop: Atlanta, and Cobra Kai. In 2018, it was estimated that film and television productions contributed US$9.5 billion to Georgia's economy.

- Judd Apatow
- Amy Schumer
- Sean Penn
- Alec Baldwin
- Don Cheadle
- Rosie O'Donnell
- Patton Oswalt
- Sarah Silverman
- Mia Farrow
- Alyssa Milano
- Jaime King
- J. J. Abrams
- Uzo Aduba
- Christina Applegate
- Essence Atkins
- Jason Bateman
- Maria Bello
- Michael Ian Black
- Yvette Nicole Brown
- Sophia Bush
- Holly Marie Combs
- Laverne Cox
- Jon Cryer
- David Cross
- Felicia Day
- Minnie Driver
- Frances Fisher
- Joanna Going
- Adam Goldberg
- Dallas Roberts
- Ron Howard
- Bob Iger
- Kendrick Sampson
- Greg Grunberg
- Colin Hanks
- Johnathon Schaech
- Alia Shawkat
- Michael Sheen
- Ben Stiller
- Aimee Mann
- Debra Messing
- Michael Kelly
- Tim Heidecker
- Heather Matarazzo
- Javier Muñoz
- Jordan Peele
- Piper Perabo
- Tara Strong
- Kristen Wiig
- Bradley Whitford
- Wil Wheaton
- David Wain
- Elizabeth Tulloch
- Gabrielle Union
- Nick Thune
- Amber Tamblyn

== Legal challenges ==
=== Federal court cases ===
The American Civil Liberties Union, Planned Parenthood and the Center for Reproductive Rights sued the state in June 2019 and sought an injunction against enforcement of the ban before it would go into effect in January 2020. The case was heard in the United States District Court for the Northern District of Georgia under Judge Steve C. Jones. Jones ruled in favor of the injunction to block enforcement in his decision in October 2019, stating "By banning pre-viability abortions, H.B. 481 violates the constitutional right to privacy, which, in turn, inflicts per se irreparable harm on Plaintiffs."

In July 2020, the bill was ruled unconstitutional by Judge Jones. The state appealed to the Eleventh Circuit. With the Supreme Court scheduled to hear arguments on Dobbs v. Jackson Women's Health Organization in December 2021, a case involving Mississippi's abortion law that banned abortions after 15 weeks and asking questions related to the general provisions set by Roe v. Wade, the Eleventh Circuit put a stay on review of the Georgia case until after the Supreme Court decided Dobbs. Following the Supreme Court's decision overturning Roe, the Eleventh Circuit lifted the stay and permitted the law to enter into force.

=== State court cases ===
The ACLU, SisterSong, Planned Parenthood and other groups sued the state in July 2022 following the federal case's conclusion. The parties sought an injunction against enforcement of the ban under the Constitution of Georgia. The case was filed in the Superior Court of Fulton County and will be heard by Judge Robert McBurney. On September 30, 2024, the Judge struck down the law. The state appealed the decision shortly after and was successful in reinstating the law at the Supreme Court of Georgia.

== See also ==
- Death of Amber Nicole Thurman
