= Death of Amber Thurman =

2022 abortion-related death

Amber Nicole Thurman
- Amber Nicole Thurman in 2020
- Born: September 16, 1993; Georgia, United States
- Died: August 19, 2022 (aged 28); Piedmont Henry Hospital, Stockbridge, Georgia, U.S
- Cause of death: septic shock and retained products of conception

Amber Nicole Thurman (September 16, 1993 – August 19, 2022) was a 28-year-old medical assistant who died of septic shock and retained products of conception following a medication abortion. Georgia's maternal mortality committee determined that Thurman's death was preventable and noted that the involuntary delay in performing the dilation and curettage (D&C) procedure significantly contributed to her death.

== Background ==
Amber Nicole Thurman was born on September 16, 1993, in Georgia. Thurman, a single mother of a young son, and a medical assistant, had become pregnant in 2022 and decided to terminate the pregnancy. Georgia's recently enacted abortion law, which prohibited most abortions after six weeks, restricted her ability to access a surgical abortion in the state. By the time her pregnancy was confirmed, she had passed the six-week limit.

In mid-August 2022, Thurman traveled to North Carolina, where abortion remains legal in the first trimester. Arriving late for the procedure, she was handed the abortion pills mifepristone and misoprostol. After taking the medication, she experienced a rare complication, incomplete expulsion of fetal tissue, which resulted in a severe infection.

Five days later, on August 19, 2022, Thurman went to Piedmont Henry Hospital in Stockbridge, Georgia, after her symptoms worsened. She showed signs of sepsis, including a high white blood cell count and low blood pressure, which indicated a serious infection. Medical guidelines suggest a procedure known as dilation and curettage (D&C) should be performed promptly in such cases to remove the remaining tissue. Georgia's new abortion law, which criminalized most abortions after six weeks, included exceptions for life-threatening situations. By the time the procedure was performed twenty hours later, Thurman's condition had deteriorated, and she died that same day. According to her death certificate, Thurman died of septic shock and retained products of conception, a description so rare that the last time it had been cited in Georgia death records was 15 years prior.

A review by Georgia's maternal mortality committee determined that Thurman's death was preventable and noted that the delay in performing the D&C significantly contributed to her death. Medical experts confirmed that earlier intervention could have improved her chances of survival.

== Reactions ==
Georgia's maternal mortality committee criticized the hospital for not having clear policies in place for treating septic abortions under the new law. Her case was one of the first documented abortion-related deaths following the U.S. Supreme Court's 2022 decision to overturn Roe v. Wade.

Thurman's death sparked widespread reaction and debate about the impact of strict abortion laws on maternal health. The case has reignited discussions about maternal mortality in the U.S., particularly among Black women, who face higher rates of pregnancy-related complications and deaths. It has also intensified debates about the impact of abortion restrictions on medical care and women's health.

Then–United States Vice President Kamala Harris issued a statement blaming Thurman's death on "Trump abortion bans" and highlighting the consequences of overturning Roe v. Wade. U.S. senator Elizabeth Warren (D-MA) also commented on the case, emphasizing that Thurman's death was preventable and criticizing the abortion ban.

The Georgia Republican Assembly published a response denying claims that Thurman's death was due to state abortion-related laws and that the death was the result of medical malpractice.

The Center for Reproductive Rights pointed to Thurman's case as evidence of the dangers posed by strict abortion laws. The American Association of Pro-Life OBGYNs attributed Thurman's death to side effects of legal abortion drugs and medical negligence. Dr. Christina Francis, a pro-life OB-GYN physician, wrote in the Atlanta Journal Constitution an opinion editorial that "Georgia's pro-life heartbeat act was not responsible for Thurman's death. That is because the law allows physicians to intervene in cases of medical emergencies or if the preborn child has no detectable heartbeat. Both of these clearly applied in Thurman's case. Furthermore, a D&C to remove the remains of an unborn child that has died is not an abortion and is not criminalized in Georgia."

Timothy Carney authored a column published in the Washington Examiner which posited that the Henry County hospital's delay in care could have been due to confusion caused by inaccurate descriptions of the Georgia law frequently publicized by its opponents. Neither the hospital nor an official investigating body has given a reason why the delay occurred.[Extreme bias of reference source]

== See also ==
- Black maternal mortality in the United States
- Death of Chaniece Wallace
- Death of Sha-Asia Washington
- Race and maternal health in the United States
- Women's health movement in the United States
