= Women in the United States =

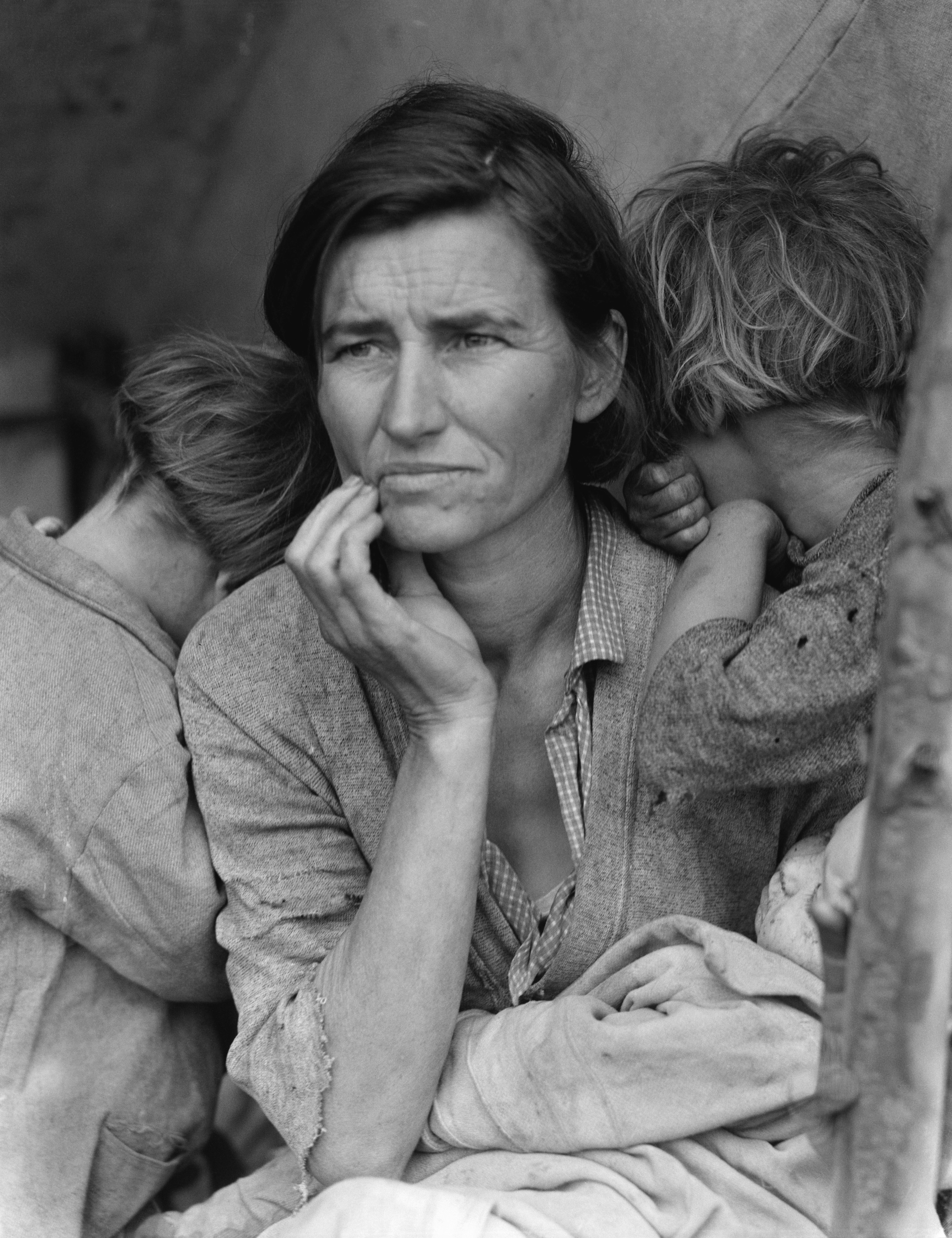
- "Migrant Mother" by Dorothea Lange (1936)

General statistics
- Maternal mortality (per 100,000): 18.6 (2023)
- Women in parliament: 26.7% (2021)
- Women over 25 with secondary education: 95.4% (2015)
- Women in labour force: 56.0% (2015)

Gender Inequality Index
- Value: 0.179 (2021)
- Rank: 44th out of 191

Global Gender Gap Index
- Value: 0.769 (2022)
- Rank: 27th out of 146

The legal status of women in the United States has advanced significantly over the past two centuries, but not yet equal to that of men in comparison to other high-income democracies.

In the early history of the United States, women were largely confined to domestic roles. Labor shortages during World War II led to an influx of women in the workforce, which helped to build toward the women's liberation movement of the 1960s and '70s. Since then, women have gained greater visibility in public life, but significant legal and cultural gaps remain.

The United States has never ratified the U.N.’s Convention on the Elimination of All Forms of Discrimination against Women and has failed to pass the Equal Rights Amendment (ERA), leaving women without explicit constitutional protections against sex discrimination.

== History ==
The earliest women living in what is now the United States were Native Americans. European women arrived in the 17th century and brought with them European culture and values. During the 19th century, women were primarily restricted to domestic roles in keeping with Protestant values. The campaign for women's suffrage in the United States culminated with the adoption of the Nineteenth Amendment to the U.S. Constitution in 1920. During World War II, many women filled roles vacated by men fighting overseas. Beginning in the 1960s, the second-wave feminist movement changed cultural perceptions of women, although it was unsuccessful in passing the Equal Rights Amendment. In the 21st century, women have achieved greater representation in prominent roles in American life.

The study of women's history has been a major scholarly and popular field, with many scholarly books and articles, museum exhibits, and courses in schools and universities. The roles of women were long ignored in textbooks and popular histories. By the 1960s, women were being presented more often. An early feminist approach underscored their victimization and inferior status at the hands of men. In the 21st century, writers have emphasized the distinctive strengths displayed inside the community of women, with special concern for minorities among women.

== Laws ==
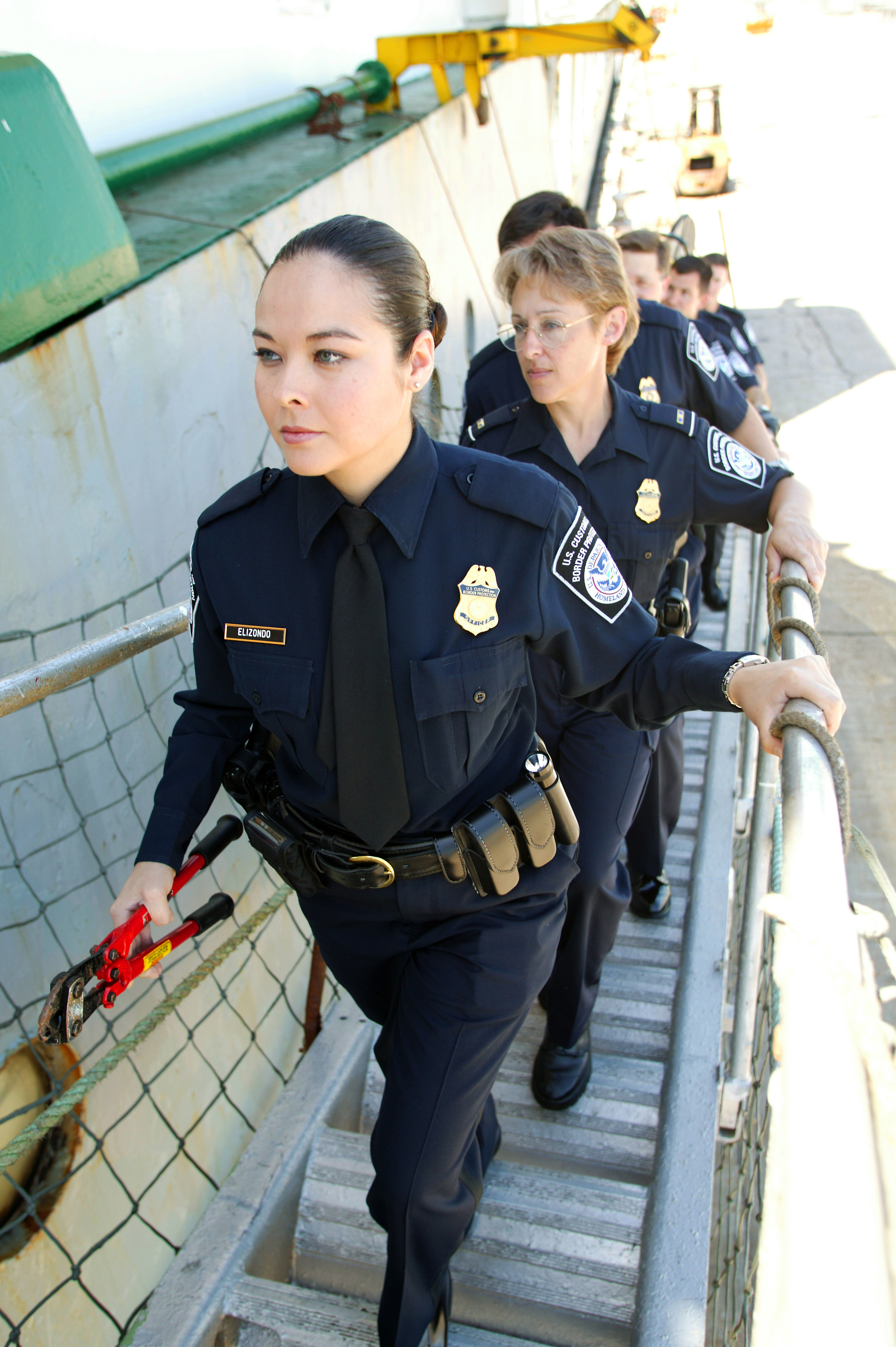
Female law enforcement officers in the United States of America.

=== Convention to Eliminate All Forms of Discrimination Against Women ===
The United States has never ratified the U.N.'s Convention on the Elimination of All Forms of Discrimination against Women, although it played an important role in drafting the treaty. As of 2014, the United States is thus one of only seven nations which have not ratified it – also including Iran, Palau, Somalia, South Sudan, Sudan, and Tonga.

=== Equal Rights Amendment ===
38 states as of January 2020 have ratified the Equal Rights Amendment (ERA). Three-fourths or 38 out of 50 states are required to ratify a proposed amendment to the U.S. Constitution. Several states originally ratified the ERA, but subsequently rescinded the ratification. Recessions in other amendments have been ignored by the courts. The status of the ERA is currently unclear, but cannot be legally implemented due to year deadline constraints.

=== Legal and Financial Autonomy ===
Until the passage of the Equal Credit Opportunity Act in 1974, women in the United States were often unable to open a credit card, secure a loan, or even open a bank account without the signature of a husband or male relative. Married women also faced restrictions on property ownership in some states until the late 20th century. Divorce laws historically favored men, leaving women with limited legal recourse and often without financial independence. Although many of these barriers have been lifted, structural inequalities continue to affect women’s ability to access credit, build wealth, and secure economic autonomy.

=== Voting Rights ===
The Nineteenth Amendment (1920) granted women the right to vote nationwide, but this right was not equally accessible to all women. Many Black women, particularly in the South, were disenfranchised through poll taxes, literacy tests, and intimidation until the passage of the Voting Rights Act of 1965. Native American women were not granted U.S. citizenship and suffrage until the Indian Citizenship Act of 1924, and state-level restrictions often continued to deny them access to the ballot for decades. Asian American women also faced barriers until discriminatory naturalization laws were repealed in the mid-20th century.

These historical exclusions illustrate that the formal recognition of women’s suffrage in 1920 did not result in universal voting rights for all women in practice.

=== Child Marriage ===
Child marriage remains legal in most U.S. states, despite international recognition of the practice as a violation of human rights. As defined by UNICEF, child marriage includes couples who are formally married or who live together as a sexually active couple in an informal union when at least one partner — usually the girl — is under the age of 18.

While federal law sets 18 as the general minimum age of marriage, state laws override this with parental or judicial consent provisions. As of 2023, over 40 U.S. states still allow minors to marry, and several have no absolute minimum age when exceptions are granted. This disproportionately affects girls, often leading to adverse outcomes in education, health, and personal autonomy.

=== Parental Leave ===
The United States is the only high income country not to provide required paid parental leave.

=== Reproductive Rights ===
Birth control is legal nationwide as of 1965. Abortion was legalized nationwide in 1973 following the Roe v. Wade decision, with states permitted to impose certain regulations short of prohibition after the first trimester. On June 25, 2022, the Supreme Court overturned Roe in Dobbs v. Jackson Women's Health Organization, removing federal protection for abortion rights and returning authority to individual states. This decision has created a patchwork of laws across the country, with some states enacting near-total bans and others maintaining broader access. Compared to other high-income democracies, the United States now has among the widest disparities in abortion access, depending on geography. Medication abortion—primarily using the drug mifepristone—accounts for the majority of abortions in the U.S., and its legal status has been the subject of ongoing court challenges. Ongoing legal disputes, as well as efforts to restrict or protect abortion at both the state and federal levels, continue to shape reproductive rights in the country.

=== Healthcare Inequities ===
The United States has the highest maternal mortality rate among developed nations, with Black women experiencing pregnancy-related deaths at nearly three times the rate of white women.

Access to reproductive healthcare in the U.S. is geographically inconsistent and highly politicized. States vary widely in the availability of abortion, contraception, and maternal healthcare, creating some of the starkest disparities in women’s health outcomes among high-income democracies.

=== Workplace Inequality and Pay Gap ===
Despite the passage of the Equal Pay Act of 1963, women in the United States continue to earn less than men on average. In 2022, women earned approximately 82 cents for every dollar earned by men, with the gap significantly wider for Black women and Latina women.

In addition, the United States lacks federally mandated paid maternity leave, making it an outlier among industrialized democracies. The absence of national standards for paid family leave and affordable childcare further contributes to women’s economic inequality.

=== Violence and Legal Protection ===
Women in the United States face persistent gaps in legal protection against domestic violence, sexual assault, and workplace harassment. The Violence Against Women Act (VAWA), first passed in 1994 and reauthorized several times since, provides federal funding and programs to support survivors. However, enforcement varies by state, and some provisions have been struck down by the Supreme Court of the United States, limiting federal authority to prosecute perpetrators.

The United States also lacks uniform protections for victims of marital rape and stalking, with laws differing widely between states. These gaps mean that women’s access to justice and safety often depends heavily on where they live.

== Representation in government ==
=== President and Vice President ===
A woman has never been President of the United States. Kamala Harris is the first woman to become Vice President of the United States, in 2021.

=== United States House of Representatives ===
The first woman elected to the United States House of Representatives was in 1917, Jeannette Rankin, who represented Montana. Women who served before her were finishing someone else's term who died in office or had resigned.

In 2007, Nancy Pelosi was elected the 52nd Speaker of the House of Representatives. Pelosi is the only woman in U.S. history to serve as Speaker. In 2019 she was again elected Speaker for the 2nd time (55th) and the first former Speaker to return to the position since 1955. As Speaker, Pelosi was the second highest ranking female elected official and second in the presidential line of succession.

As of 2021, there are 119 women of 435 total in the U.S. House of Representatives, 88 Democrats, 31 Republicans.

=== United States Senate ===
In its first 130 years in existence, the Senate was entirely male. In 1931, Hattie Wyatt Caraway was the first woman to win election to the United States Senate. Margaret Chase Smith was the first woman to serve in both the House and the Senate in 1949. In 1992, an unprecedented four women were elected to the Senate, Patty Murray, Dianne Feinstein, Barbara Boxer and Carol Moseley Braun who was also the first woman of color in the Senate. Today, of 100 members of the U.S. Senate, there are 24 women senators, 16 Democrats and 8 Republicans.

=== Presidential Cabinet ===
In 1933 Frances Perkins was appointed United States Secretary of Labor under President Franklin D. Roosevelt, making her the first woman to serve in a presidential cabinet. In 1949, Georgia Neese Clark was the first woman appointed Treasurer of the United States followed by Oveta Culp Hobby as United States Secretary of Health, Education, and Welfare in 1953.

The 1970s would see several women appointed for the first time in cabinet positions such as Carla Anderson Hills, United States Secretary of Housing and Urban Development in 1975, Juanita M. Kreps, United States Secretary of Commerce in 1977 and Shirley Hufstedler, Secretary of Education in 1979.

In the 1980s, Elizabeth Dole was appointed United States Secretary of Transportation in 1983. Elaine Chao would become third woman and first Asian American to hold this position in 2017. Susan Engeleiter was appointed the head of the Small Business Administration in 1989.

In the 1993, Janet Reno as United States Attorney General and Sheila Widnall as United States Secretary of the Air Force were the first women appointed to their positions. Three women have served as United States Secretary of State. The first was Madeleine Albright in 1997. In 2005 Condoleezza Rice became the second woman and first person of color to serve in this position. She was succeeded by former First Lady of the United States and U.S. Senator, Hillary Clinton in 2009.

Ann Veneman as United States Secretary of Agriculture, Gale Norton, United States Secretary of the Interior and Susan Livingstone, United States Secretary of the Navy were all the first women appointed to their positions in 2001 and 2003 respectively.

Janet Napolitano became the first woman to be appointed United States Secretary of Homeland Security in 2009 and Gina Haspel was the first woman appointed Director of the Central Intelligence Agency in 2018.

=== United States Supreme Court ===
On the Supreme Court, there are four women justices, Sonia Sotomayor, Elena Kagan, Amy Coney Barrett, and Ketanji Brown Jackson. The first woman justice was Sandra Day O'Connor in 1981 followed by Ruth Bader Ginsburg in 1993.

=== State and local governments ===
As of 2021, there are 9 women state governors, 6 Democrats, 3 Republicans; there are 17 Lt. Governors, 10 Democrats, 7 Republicans. Women hold 31.0% of the seats on state legislatures. Of the 100 largest cities in the United States, 31 have a woman as mayor.

Twenty-one state supreme courts (the highest state court) are currently or have been majority female.

== Desire to leave the United States ==
According to a Gallup poll from January 2019, 40 percent of women under the age of 30 would like to leave the United States, as compared with 20 percent of men in the same age group. By about 50 years of age, however, this gender gap disappears.

== Rankings ==
=== Gender equality ranking ===
As of 2021, the United States is ranked 30th of 156 applicable countries in gender equality on the World Economic Forum's Gender Gap Index.

== Statistics ==
=== Education ===
As of 2014, women in the United States earn more post-secondary (college and graduate school) degrees than men do.

=== Marriage ===
As of 2013, the most recent year for which statistics are available, average age at first marriage in the United States is 27 for women and 29 for men.

=== Workforce ===
In 2024, 79.1 million women aged 16 and older were in the civilian labor force, and their labor force participation rate was 57.5%.

Sex discrimination has been outlawed in non-ministerial employment in the United States since 1964 nationwide; however, under a judicially created doctrine called the "ministerial exemption," religious organizations are immune from sex discrimination suits brought by "ministerial employees," a category that includes such religious roles as priests, imams or kosher supervisors.

A woman's median salary in the United States has increased over time, although as of 2014 it is only 77% of man's median salary, a phenomenon often referred to as the Gender Pay Gap. (A woman's average salary is reported as 84% of a man's average salary.) Whether this is due to discrimination is very hotly disputed, while economists and sociologists have provided evidence both supporting and debunking this assertion.

The percentage of women by occupational group in USA for 2022 is shown in table below.

Occupation	Percentage of women
Accountants and auditors	58.0
Actuaries	30.5
Administrative services managers	71.9
Advertising and promotions managers	55.7
Advertising sales agents	47.5
Aerospace engineers	13.8
Agents and managers of artists and athletes	44.9
Agricultural and food science technicians	34.2
Agricultural and food scientists	31.8
Animal caretakers	72.1
Animal trainers	58.0
Architects, except landscape and naval	25.4
Architectural and civil drafters	17.3
Architectural and engineering managers	11.8
Archivists, curators, and museum technicians	54.8
Artists and related workers	41.0
Automotive service technicians	1.6
Baggage porters, bellhops, and concierges	25.8
Bakers	57.1
Barbers	18.8
Bartenders	49.3
Bill and account collectors	73.4
Billing and posting clerks	86.8
Biological scientists	46.7
Biological technicians	53.3
Bookkeeping, accounting, and auditing clerks	86.4
Budget analysts	63.5
Bus drivers, school	51.8
Bus drivers, transit and intercity	29.6
Business operations specialists, all other	56.3
Butchers and other meat processing workers	20.9
Cardiovascular technologists and technicians	62.4
Cargo and freight agents	45.5
Carpenters	1.9
Cashiers	68.2
Chefs and head cooks	20.1
Chemical engineers	19.5
Chemical processing operators and tenders	13.0
Chemical technicians	33.9
Chemists and materials scientists	38.2
Chief executives	28.6
Child, family, and school social workers	83.3
Childcare workers	95.2
Chiropractors	28.3
Civil engineers	16.4
Claims adjusters, appraisers, and investigators	60.3
Cleaners of vehicles and equipment	17.9
Clergy	15.1
Clinical laboratory technologists and technicians	70.2
Coaches and scouts	36.3
Compensation and benefits specialists	72.9
Compliance officers	55.2
Computer and information systems managers	27.1
Computer network architects	9.9
Computer numerically controlled tool operators	10.1
Computer occupations, all other	23.1
Computer programmers	17.6
Computer support specialists	24.6
Computer systems analysts	40.1
Computer and automated teller repairers	9.2
Conservation scientists and foresters	33.9
Construction and building inspectors	8.5
Construction equipment operators	2.6
Construction laborers	3.5
Construction managers	8.4
Cooks	38.1
Correctional officers and jailers	27.0
Cost estimators	16.0
Counselors, all other	66.3
Counter and rental clerks	36.4
Couriers and messengers	19.8
Court, municipal, and license clerks	82.9
Credit analysts	49.7
Credit authorizers, checkers, and clerks	69.6
Credit counselors and loan officers	52.4
Customer service representatives	67.0
Cutting workers	26.0
Cutting, punching, and press machine operators	15.0
Data entry keyers	75.1
Database administrators and architects	28.8
Dental and ophthalmic laboratory technicians	56.1
Dental assistants	93.1
Dentists	32.0
Detectives and criminal investigators	26.8
Diagnostic medical sonographers	74.9
Dietitians and nutritionists	88.3
Dining room and cafeteria attendants	52.1
Directors, religious activities and education	55.5
Dishwashers	21.5
Dispatchers, except police, fire, and ambulance	54.2
Door-to-door sales workers and related workers	40.4
Driver/sales workers and truck drivers	5.7
Economists	39.3
Editors	57.2
Education and childcare administrators	64.4
Educational, guidance, and career counselors and advisors	76.0
Electrical and electronics engineers	8.2
Electrical, electronics, and electromechanical assemblers	43.2
Electricians	2.0
Elementary and middle school teachers	79.4
Eligibility interviewers, government programs	80.1
Emergency medical technicians	40.7
Engineers, all other	14.0
Entertainment and recreation managers	36.5
Environmental engineers	31.8
Environmental scientists and specialists	41.2
Executive secretaries and executive administrative assistants	94.3
Exercise trainers and group fitness instructors	46.3
Facilities managers	19.9
Farmers, ranchers, and other agricultural managers	13.2
Fast food and counter workers	62.0
File clerks	74.8
Financial and investment analysts	41.8
Financial clerks, all other	62.4
Financial examiners	46.3
Financial managers	54.8
Firefighters	5.0
First-line supervisors of construction and extraction workers	3.8
First-line supervisors of correctional officers	31.2
First-line supervisors of food preparation and serving workers	57.7
First-line supervisors of housekeeping and janitorial workers	43.2
First-line supervisors of landscaping, and groundskeeping workers	8.0
First-line supervisors of mechanics, installers, and repairers	7.4
First-Line supervisors of non-retail sales workers	37.4
First-Line supervisors of administrative support workers	66.1
First-line supervisors of police and detectives	15.8
First-line supervisors of production and operating workers	21.2
First-Line supervisors of retail sales workers	43.1
First-line supervisors of security workers	28.2
Flight attendants	71.2
Food batchmakers	58.4
Food preparation workers	58.7
Food processing workers, all other	31.1
Food servers, nonrestaurant	60.2
Food service managers	46.1
Fundraisers	72.9
Gambling services workers	39.6
General and operations managers	34.0
Geoscientists and hydrologists, except geographers	20.9
Graders and sorters, agricultural products	65.4
Graphic designers	51.5
Hairdressers, hairstylists, and cosmetologists	89.0
Healthcare social workers	80.3
Helpers--production workers	26.8
Home health aides	86.5
Hosts and hostesses	75.2
Hotel, motel, and resort desk clerks	58.8
Human resources assistants	79.2
Human resources managers	75.3
Human resources workers	74.4
Industrial and refractory machinery mechanics	4.1
Industrial engineers, including health and safety	23.6
Industrial production managers	23.4
Industrial truck and tractor operators	9.2
Information and record clerks, all other	74.7
Information security analysts	16.8
Inspectors, testers, sorters, samplers, and weighers	37.0
Insurance claims and policy processing clerks	82.1
Insurance sales agents	50.5
Insurance underwriters	60.1
Interior designers	79.5
Interpreters and translators	70.5
Interviewers, except eligibility and loan	78.1
Janitors and building cleaners	29.7
Jewelers and precious stone and metal workers	35.9
Judges, magistrates, and other judicial workers	53.5
Laborers and freight, stock, and material movers	22.1
Landscape architects	28.1
Landscaping and groundskeeping workers	5.6
Laundry and dry-cleaning workers	64.3
Lawyers	38.6
Legal support workers, all other	66.5
Librarians and media collections specialists	78.0
Library assistants, clerical	76.9
Licensed practical and licensed vocational nurses	88.5
Loan interviewers and clerks	77.8
Lodging managers	46.8
Logisticians	37.4
Machine feeders and offbearers	46.1
Machinists	4.2
Magnetic resonance imaging technologists	55.0
Maids and housekeeping cleaners	82.5
Mail clerks and mail machine operators	48.7
Maintenance and repair workers	4.0
Management analysts	43.2
Managers, all other	38.2
Manicurists and pedicurists	76.9
Market research analysts and marketing specialists	58.0
Marketing managers	61.1
Massage therapists	73.8
Materials engineers	15.3
Mechanical engineers	9.3
Medical and health services managers	72.1
Medical assistants	91.2
Medical records specialists	91.0
Medical scientists	56.8
Meeting, convention, and event planners	75.7
Mental health counselors	75.5
Miscellaneous agricultural workers	19.2
Miscellaneous health technologists and technicians	64.6
Miscellaneous social scientists and related workers	49.1
Morticians, undertakers, and funeral arrangers	34.2
Motor vehicle operators, all other	19.6
Musicians and singers	24.5
Natural sciences managers	64.1
Network and computer systems administrators	16.8
News analysts, reporters, and journalists	45.1
Nuclear medicine technologists and medical dosimetrists	46.1
Nurse anesthetists	54.8
Nurse practitioners	86.9
Nursing assistants	87.0
Occupational health and safety specialists	33.2
Occupational therapists	86.3
Office and administrative support workers, all other	73.1
Office clerks, general	82.2
Operations research analysts	49.7
Opticians, dispensing	68.4
Optometrists	41.8
Order clerks	52.7
Orderlies and psychiatric aides	39.8
Other assemblers and fabricators	34.6
Other community and social service specialists	70.2
Other designers	39.2
Other drafters	17.6
Other educational instruction and library workers	76.1
Other engineering technologists and technicians	19.6
Other entertainment attendants and related workers	42.1
Other financial specialists	56.0
Other healthcare practitioners and technical occupations	66.7
Other healthcare support workers	68.0
Other installation, maintenance, and repair workers	4.8
Other life, physical, and social science technicians	51.4
Other material moving workers	11.5
Other mathematical science occupations	42.7
Other metal workers and plastic workers	21.1
Other production workers	28.7
Other protective service workers	36.7
Other psychologists	71.1
Other teachers and instructors	53.8
Other transportation workers	22.7
Packaging and filling machine operators and tenders	52.8
Packers and packagers, hand	55.8
Painters and paperhangers	7.3
Painting workers	9.1
Paralegals and legal assistants	85.5
Paramedics	30.4
Parts salespersons	15.0
Payroll and timekeeping clerks	86.4
Personal care aides	79.4
Personal care and service workers, all other	52.9
Personal financial advisors	30.5
Personal service managers, all other	67.4
Pharmacists	56.8
Pharmacy technicians	75.9
Phlebotomists	83.1
Photographers	41.5
Physical scientists, all other	43.3
Physical therapist assistants and aides	63.8
Physical therapists	57.8
Physician assistants	64.0
Police officers	13.9
Postal service clerks	52.9
Postal service mail carriers	37.5
Postal service mail sorters and processing machine operators	44.9
Postmasters and mail superintendents	47.5
Postsecondary teachers	48.1
Preschool and kindergarten teachers	97.4
Printing press operators	19.8
Private detectives and investigators	49.0
Probation officers and correctional treatment specialists	57.8
Procurement clerks	51.7
Producers and directors	38.0
Production, planning, and expediting clerks	50.9
Project management specialists	45.1
Property appraisers and assessors	34.1
Property, real estate, and community association managers	53.2
Psychiatric technicians	73.1
Public relations and fundraising managers	67.2
Public relations specialists	63.8
Public safety telecommunicators	64.5
Purchasing agents, except wholesale, retail, and farm products	52.6
Purchasing managers	50.0
Radio and telecommunications equipment installers and repairers	6.3
Radiologic technologists and technicians	65.3
Real estate brokers and sales agents	51.4
Receptionists and information clerks	89.3
Recreation workers	68.3
Registered nurses	86.2
Religious workers, all other	57.0
Reservation and transportation ticket agents and travel clerks	49.9
Residential advisors	57.4
Respiratory therapists	62.4
Retail salespersons	37.4
Sales and related workers, all other	47.5
Sales managers	30.9
Sales representatives of services	28.6
Sales representatives, wholesale and manufacturing	26.4
Secondary school teachers	56.2
Secretaries and administrative assistants	93.0
Securities, commodities, and financial services sales agents	26.5
Security guards and gambling surveillance officers	22.2
Sewing machine operators	68.5
Shipping, receiving, and inventory clerks	33.4
Social and community service managers	70.7
Social and human service assistants	77.0
Social workers, all other	83.7
Software developers	18.1
Software quality assurance analysts and testers	47.4
Special education teachers	85.3
Speech-language pathologists	94.3
Statistical assistants	51.1
Statisticians	48.7
Stockers and order fillers	35.1
Substance abuse and behavioral disorder counselors	72.3
Supervisors of personal care and service workers	50.7
Supervisors of transportation and material moving workers	24.9
Surgeons	21.0
Surgical technologists	75.3
Tailors, dressmakers, and sewers	66.3
Tax examiners and collectors, and revenue agents	63.6
Tax preparers	58.9
Taxi drivers	12.0
Teaching assistants	82.4
Technical writers	56.1
Television, video, and film camera operators and editors	19.2
Tellers	85.9
Therapists, all other	80.8
Title examiners, abstractors, and searchers	75.8
Training and development managers	59.0
Training and development specialists	53.6
Transportation security screeners	36.2
Transportation service attendants	17.8
Transportation, storage, and distribution managers	21.3
Travel agents	77.9
Tutors	68.1
Urban and regional planners	44.6
Veterinarians	63.1
Veterinary assistants and laboratory animal caretakers	83.9
Veterinary technologists and technicians	89.5
Waiters and waitresses	63.3
Web and digital interface designers	46.0
Web developers	26.5
Weighers, measurers, checkers, and samplers	43.5
Welding, soldering, and brazing workers	5.3
Wholesale and retail buyers, except farm products	48.7
Writers and authors	55.5

=== Voting ===
While the majority of women tend to vote Democratic, they have differences in voting between women of different races. White women tend to vote for the Republican party, black and Hispanic tend to vote for the Democratic party.

National exit polling among women
Year	Branch	% of Democratic women vote
1976	United States Presidency	52
1980	United States Presidency	46
1982	United States House of Representatives	58
1984	United States House of Representatives	54
1984	United States Presidency	42
1986	United States House of Representatives	54
1988	United States House of Representatives	57
1988	United States Presidency	49
1990	United States House of Representatives	54
1992	United States House of Representatives	55
1992	United States Presidency	45
1994	United States House of Representatives	53
1996	United States House of Representatives	55
1996	United States Presidency	55
1998	United States House of Representatives	53
2000	United States House of Representatives	54
2000	United States Presidency	54
2002	United States House of Representatives	50
2004	United States House of Representatives	53
2004	United States Presidency	51
2006	United States House of Representatives	56
2008	United States House of Representatives	57
2008	United States Presidency	56
2010	United States House of Representatives	49
2012	United States House of Representatives	56
2012	United States Presidency	55
2014	United States House of Representatives	52
2016	United States Presidency	54
2016	United States House of Representatives	54
2018	United States House of Representatives	59
2020	United States Presidency	57
2020	United States House of Representatives	57
2024	United States Presidency	53

== Reproductive health ==
Women's reproductive health in the United States refers to the set of physical, mental, and social issues related to the health of women in the United States. It includes the rights of women in the United States to adequate sexual health, available contraception methods, and treatment for sexually transmitted diseases. The prevalence of women's health issues in American culture is inspired by second-wave feminism in the United States. As a result of this movement, women of the United States began to question the largely male-dominated health care system and demanded a right to information on issues regarding their physiology and anatomy. The U.S. government has made significant strides to propose solutions, like creating the Women's Health Initiative through the Office of Research on Women's Health in 1991. However, many issues still exist related to the accessibility of reproductive healthcare as well as the stigma and controversy attached to sexual health, contraception, and sexually transmitted diseases.

The Department of Health and Human Services has developed a definition for sexual health in the United States based on the World Health Organization's definition of sexual health.

"Sexual health is a state of well-being in relation to sexuality across the life span that involves physical, emotional, mental, social and spiritual dimensions. Sexual health is an intrinsic element of human health and is based on positive, equitable, and respectful approach to sexuality, relationships, and reproduction, that is free of coercion, fear, discrimination, stigma, shame, and violence.

The United States government recognizes that gender is a factor which plays a significant role in sexual health.

Partially influenced by second-wave feminism, women in the U.S. challenged the male dominated healthcare system while also demanding better information and autonomy over their bodies. Initiatives such as the Women’s Health Initiative have improved awareness and research, however, significant barriers still remain. Those barriers include limited access to reproductive services, stigma surrounding sexual health, contraception, and STIs.

== Violence ==
Violence against women has been recognized as a public health concern in the United States. Culture in the country has promoted the trivialization of women-directed violence, with media in the United States creating the appearance of violence against women unimportant to the public.

The Centers for Disease Control and Prevention and the National Institute of Justice reports that about 1 in every 4 women suffer from at least one physical assault experience from a partner during adulthood. Studies have found that around 20% of women in the United States have been victims of rape with many incidents of rape being underreported according to a 2013 study.

== See also ==
- 2017 Women's March
- 2018 Women's March
- 2019 Women's March
- 2020 Women's March
- 2021 Women's March
- 2022 Women's March
- Arthur and Elizabeth Schlesinger Library on the History of Women in America
- Women in the Americas
