= Maternal mortality in the United States =

Maternal mortality in the USA since 1900

Maternal deaths per 100,000 births. From article: "A maternal death is defined as the death of a woman while pregnant or within 42 days of termination of pregnancy, irrespective of the duration and the site of the pregnancy, from any cause related to or aggravated by the pregnancy or its management, but not from accidental or incidental causes."

Maternal mortality refers to the death of a woman during her pregnancy or up to a year after her pregnancy has terminated; this metric only includes causes related to the pregnancy, and does not include accidental causes. Some sources define maternal mortality as the death of a woman up to 42 days after the pregnancy has ended, instead of one year. In 1986, the CDC began tracking pregnancy-related deaths to gather information and determine what was causing these deaths by creating the Pregnancy-Related Mortality Surveillance System. According to a 2010–2011 report, although the United States was spending more on healthcare than any other country in the world, more than two women died during childbirth every day, making maternal mortality in the United States the highest (12.7 deaths per 100,000 births) when compared to 49 other countries in the developed world.

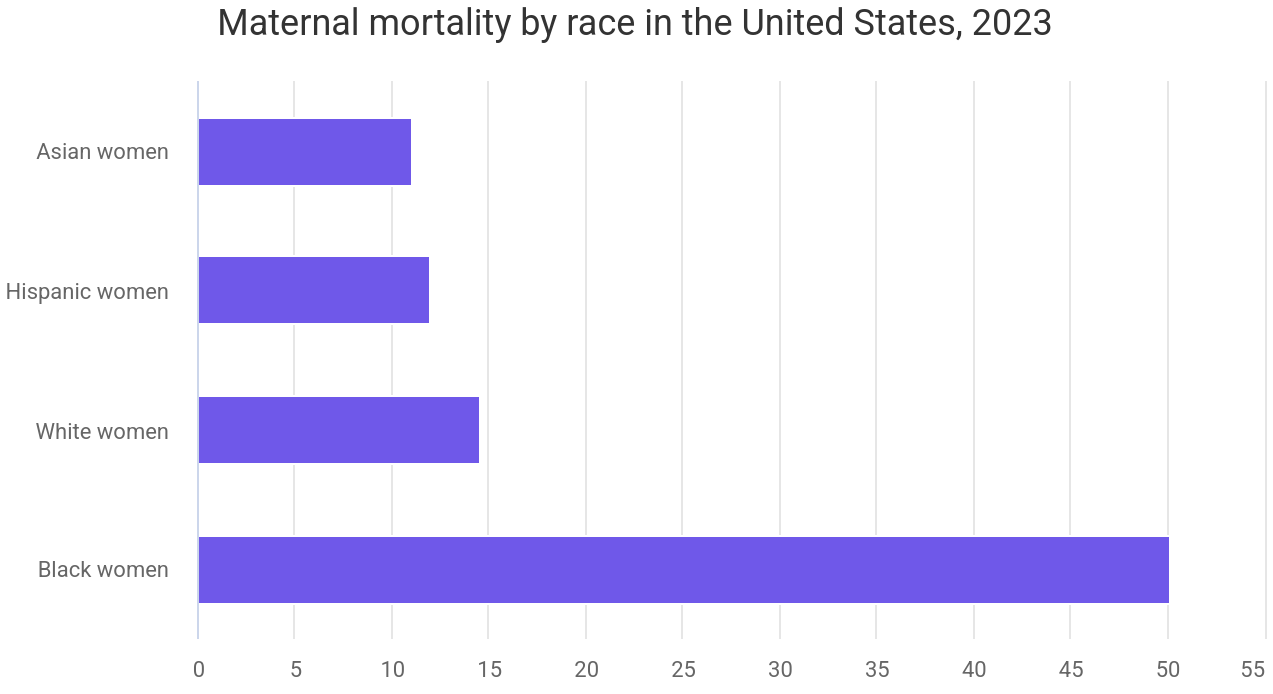
There are significant racial disparities in maternal mortality rates in the United States. In 2023, pregnant black women had a mortality rate 4.5 times higher than pregnant Asian women.

As of 2023, the US had an estimated 18.6 deaths per 100,000 births. The CDC reported an increase in the maternal mortality ratio in the United States from 18.8 deaths per 100,000 births to 23.8 deaths per 100,000 births between 2000 and 2014, a 26.6% increase. The mortality rate of pregnant and recently pregnant women in the United States rose almost 30% between 2019 and 2020. According to the CDC, a study that included data from 36 states found that more than 80% of pregnancy-related deaths were preventable between 2017 and 2019.

== Monitoring maternal mortality ==
In 1986, the Centers for Disease Control and Prevention (CDC) and the American College of Obstetricians and Gynecologists (ACOG) created the Pregnancy-Related Mortality Surveillance System to monitor maternal deaths during pregnancy and up to one year after giving birth. Prior to this, women were monitored up to six weeks postpartum.

In 2016 the CDC Foundation, the Centers for Disease Control and Prevention (CDC) and the Association of Maternal and Child Health Programs (AMCHP) undertook a collaborative initiative—"Building U.S. Capacity to Review and Prevent Maternal Deaths"— funded by Merck under the Merck for Mothers program. They are reviewing maternal mortality to enhance understanding of the increase in the maternal mortality ratio in the United States, and to identify preventative interventions. Through this initiative, they have created the Review to Action website which hosts their reports and resources. In their 2017 report, four states, Colorado, Delaware, Georgia, and Ohio, supported the development of the Maternal Mortality Review Data System (MMRDS) which was intended as a precursor to the Maternal Mortality Review Information Application (MMRIA). The three agencies have partnered with Colorado, Delaware, Georgia, Hawaii, Illinois, North Carolina, Ohio, South Carolina, and Utah to collect data for the Maternal Mortality Review Information Application (MMRIA); the nine states submitted their first reports in 2018.

After decades of inaction on the part of the U.S. Congress towards reducing the maternal mortality ratio, the United States Senate Committee on Appropriations voted on June 28, 2018, to request $50 million to prevent the pregnancy-related deaths of American women. The CDC would receive $12 million for research and data collection. They would also support individual states in counting and reviewing data on maternal deaths. The federal Maternal and Child Health Bureau would receive the remaining $38 million directed towards Healthy Start program and "life saving, evidence-based programs" at hospitals. MCHB's Healthy Start was mandated to reduce the infant mortality rate.

In 2019, Kamala Harris reintroduced the Maternal Care Access and Reducing Emergencies (CARE) Act which aimed to address the maternal mortality disparity faced by women of color by training providers on recognizing implicit racial bias and its impact on care. Harris stated:

"We need to speak the uncomfortable truth that women—and especially Black women—are too often not listened to or taken seriously by the health care system, and therefore they are denied the dignity that they deserve. And we need to speak this truth because today, the United States is 1 of only 13 countries in the world where the rate of maternal mortality is worse than it was 25 years ago. That risk is even higher for Black women, who are three to four times more likely than white women to die from pregnancy-related causes. These numbers are simply outrageous."

In the 1930s, the Maternal Mortality Review Committees (MMRCs) formed in New York City and Philadelphia in response to high maternal mortality rates. Philadelphia saw success with reducing the rates through data collected from their MMRC and over the next two decades MMRCs popped up throughout the country. MMRCs have grown and shrunk in popularity since, but the CDC now recommends MMRC data as the gold standard for understanding the causes of maternal mortality and planning intervention. The reasoning is that MMRCs are uniquely poised to identify opportunities for action despite difficulties in classifying deaths as pregnancy-related.

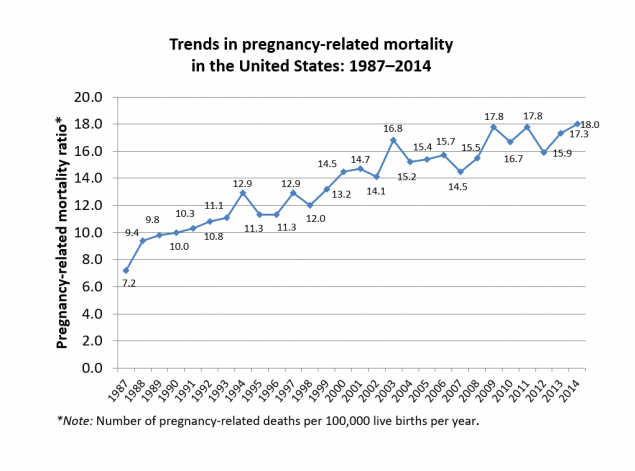
Graph showing the trend in pregnancy related deaths in the United States from 1987 to 2014.

=== Measurement and data collection ===
According to a 2016 article in Obstetrics and Gynecology by MacDorman et al., one factor affecting the US maternal death rate is the variability in the calculation of maternal deaths. The WHO deems maternal deaths to be those occurring within 42 days of the end of pregnancy, whereas the United States Pregnancy Mortality Surveillance System measures maternal deaths as those occurring within a year of the end of pregnancy. Some states allow multiple responses, such as whether the death occurred during pregnancy, within 42 days after pregnancy, or within a year of pregnancy, but some states, such as California, ask simply whether the death occurred within a year postpartum.

In their article, the authors described how data collection on maternal mortality rates became an "international embarrassment". In 2003 the national U.S. standard death certificate added a "tick box" question regarding the pregnancy status of the deceased. Many states delayed adopting the new death certificate standards. This "muddied" data and obstructed analysis of trends in maternal mortality rates. It also meant that for many years, the United States could not report a national maternal mortality rate to the OECD or other repositories that collect data internationally.

In response to the MacDorman study, revealing the "inability, or unwillingness, of states and the federal government to track maternal deaths", ProPublica and NPR found that in 2016 alone, between 700 and 900 women died from pregnancy- and childbirth-related causes. In "Lost Mothers" they published stories of some of women who died, ranging from 16 to 43 years of age.

Healthy People is a federal organization that is managed by the Office of Disease Prevention and Health Promotion (ODPHP) at the U.S. Department of Health and Human Services (HHS). In 2010, the US maternal mortality ratio was 12.7 (deaths per 100,000 live births). This was three times as high as the Healthy People 2010 goal, a national target set by the US government.

According to a 2009 article in Anthropology News, studies conducted by but not limited to Amnesty International, the United Nations, and federal programs such as the CDC, maternal mortality has not decreased since 1999 and may have been rising.

By November 2017, Baltimore, Philadelphia, and New York City had established committees to "review deaths and severe complications related to pregnancy and childbirth" in their cities to prevent maternal mortality. New York's panel, the Maternal Mortality and Morbidity Review Committee (M3RC), included doctors, nurses, "doulas, midwives and social workers". New York City will be collaborating with the State of New York, the first such collaboration in the US. In July 2018, New York City's de Blasio's administration announced that it would be allocating $12.8 million for the first three years of its five-year plan to "reduce maternal deaths and life-threatening complications of childbirth among women of color".

== Causes ==
=== Medical causes ===
Maternal death can be traced to maternal health, which includes wellness throughout the entire pregnancy and access to basic care.

The World Health Organization and the CDC's National Vital Statistics System (NVSS) define maternal death as that which occurs within the first 42 days after birth.

Since 1986, the Center for Disease Control conducts a Pregnancy Mortality Surveillance Service (PMSS) to study the medical causes of maternal death. This tool defines pregnancy-related death as death during or within one year of completion of a woman's pregnancy by any cause attributed to the pregnancy to capture all deaths which might be pregnancy-related.

Race, location, and financial status all contribute to how maternal mortality affects women across the country. Non-Hispanic blacks account for 41.7% of maternal deaths in the United States. Additionally to race, According to a study published in (Jones et al.,2022), a woman's social determinants of health can affect both her health and her ability to conceive. Black women are more likely than other races to experience life-threatening complications, such as hemorrhage and even worse maternal outcomes. The research investigates the link between maternal morbidity and social determinants of health. The study's author also mentioned a few risk factors for adverse pregnancy outcomes that were related to the social determinants of these women's lives. These include the mother's age, any existing health conditions, and so on (Jones et al., 2022).

Maternal Mortality Review Committees (MMRCs), state and local committees that review pregnancy related deaths, found that the leading causes of maternal mortality from 36 participating states 2017–2019 are:

1. Mental health conditions including deaths of suicide, overdose/poisoning related to substance use disorder, and other deaths determined by the MMRC to be related to a mental health condition, including substance use disorder. (23%)
2. Excessive bleeding (hemorrhage): Excluding aneurysms or cerebrovascular accident (14%)
3. Cardiac and coronary conditions (relating to the heart) (13%)
4. Infection (9%): including deaths of coronary artery disease, pulmonary hypertension, acquired and congenital valvular heart disease, vascular aneurysm, hypertensive cardiovascular disease, Marfan Syndrome, conduction defects, vascular malformations, and other cardiovascular disease; and excludes cardiomyopathy and hypertensive disorders of pregnancy.
5. Thrombotic embolism (a type of blood clot) (9%)
6. Cardiomyopathy (a disease of the heart muscle) (9%)
7. Hypertensive disorders of pregnancy (relating to high blood pressure) (7%)

=== Social factors ===
Social determinants of health also contribute to the maternal mortality rate. Some of these factors include access to healthcare, education, age, race, and income.

==== Access to healthcare ====
Women in the US usually meet with their physicians just once after delivery, six weeks after giving birth. Due to this long gap during the postpartum period, many health problems remain unchecked, which can result in maternal death. Just as women, especially women of color, have difficulty with access to prenatal care, the same is true for accessibility to postpartum care. Postpartum depression can also lead to untimely deaths for both mother and child.

Insurance companies reserve the right to categorize pregnancy as a pre-existing condition, thereby making women ineligible for private health insurance. Even access to Medicaid is curtailed to some women, due to bureaucracy and delays in coverage (if approved). Many women are turned down due to Medicaid fees, as well. According to a 2020 study conducted by Erica L. Eliason, cutting Medicaid funding limits access to prenatal healthcare, which has been shown to increase maternal mortality rates. This study concluded that Medicaid expansions directly correlated to decreases in maternal mortality rates. Although the supportive care practice of a doula has potential to improve the health of both the mother and child and reduce health disparities, these services are underutilized among low-income women and women of color, who are at greater risk of poor maternal health outcomes. Women may be unable to find or afford services or unaware that they are offered. A 2012 national survey by Childbirth Connection found that women using Medicaid to pay for birth expenses were twice as likely as those using private insurance to have never heard of a doula (36% vs. 19%). Medicaid does not cover doula care during a woman's prenatal or post-partum period. Women have also reported access and mobility as reasons why they are unable to seek prenatal care, such as lack of transportation and/or lack of health insurance. Women who do not have access to prenatal care are 3–4 times more likely to die during or after pregnancy than women who do.

Geographic location has also been found to be a contributing factor to accessing maternal health care. Data has shown that rates of maternal mortality are higher in rural areas of the United States. From 2017-2019, the rate of maternal mortality in rural areas was 26.1 per 100,000 live births as compared to 21.8 in metropolitan areas. One contributing factor is the lack of obstetric care in rural areas, with over 50% of rural counties not having access to hospital obstetric services. There is also physician shortages and a high physician turnover rates in rural areas, contributing to limited care options. Additionally, transportation barriers exist in rural communities, as more the 40% of the rural population must travel over 30 minutes to the closest maternal care facility.

==== Education ====
It has been shown that mothers between ages 18 and 44 who did not complete high school had a 5% increase in maternal mortality versus women who completed high school. By completing primary school, 10% of girls younger than 17 years old would not get pregnant and 2/3 of maternal deaths could be prevented. Secondary education, university schooling, would only further decrease rates of pregnancy and maternal death.

Of note, higher education still does not improve the racial differences in maternal mortality and is not protective for Black mothers in the way they are for White mothers. It has been found that Black mothers with a college education have greater maternal mortality than White mothers with less than a high school education.

==== Age ====
Young adolescents are at the highest risk of fatal complications of any age group. This high risk can be accounted for by various causes such as the likelihood of adolescents giving birth for the first time compared to women in older age groups. Other factors that also may lead to higher risk among this age group includes lower economic status and education. While adolescents face a higher risk of maternal mortality, a study conducted between 2005 and 2014 found that the rate of maternal mortality was higher among older women. Additionally, another study found that the rate is higher specifically among women aged 30 years or older.

==== Intimate partner violence ====
Intimate partner violence (IPV) constitutes many forms of abuse or the threat of abuse, including sexual, physical or emotional abuse and manifests as a pattern of violence from an intimate partner. Protective factors include age and marital status, while risk factors include unplanned pregnancy, lack of education and low socioeconomic status, and a new HIV positive diagnosis. The greatest at-risk group is a young, unmarried woman. During pregnancy IPV can have disastrous maternal and fetal outcomes, and it has been found that between 3% and 9% of pregnant women experience IPV.

Maternal adverse outcomes include delayed or insufficient prenatal case, poor weight gain, and an increase in nicotine, alcohol and substance abuse. IPV is also associated with adverse mental health outcomes such as depression in 40% of abused women. Neonatal adverse outcomes from IPV include low birth weight and preterm birth, an infant who is small for gestational age and even perinatal death.

Through adequate training of healthcare professionals, there is opportunity for prevention and intervention during routine obstetric visits, and routine screening is recommended. During prenatal care, only 50% of women receive counselling on IPV. Pregnancy is a unique time during a woman's life and for many women is the only time when regular healthcare is established, heightening the need for effective care from the provider.

==== Race ====
There are significant racial disparities in maternal deaths within the United States.

In 2023, Asian women had the lowest maternal death rate in the United States, with a death rate of 11 per 100,000. Hispanic women had the second lowest maternal death rate, at 12 per 100,000. White women had a death rate of 14.5 per 100,000. Black women's maternal death rate was slightly greater than 50 per 100,000.

This data revealed that the longstanding racial disparities in maternal mortality between Black women and non-Black women had worsened from 2021-2023. Black women were 3.5 times more likely to die in pregnancy than White women. Black women were 4.5 times more likely to die in pregnancy than Asian women. All non-black women experienced declines in maternal mortality during this period, while Black women's maternal mortality slightly increased.

Causes of mortality differ among racial groups. White women are more likely to experience hemorrhage, cardiomyopathy and embolism. African American women are more likely to experience hypertensive disorders, stroke, and infection. In the case of Black women in the United States, a study from the World Journal of Gynecology and Women's Health found that in addition to the link between cardiovascular disease and maternal mortality, racism in healthcare contributes to these outcomes. Notably, experiencing racism and discrimination in healthcare makes Black mothers less likely to trust the healthcare system, and the authors of this study recommend that addressing this is key to rebuilding trust and encouraging reliance on healthcare system.

Distrust in the medical system among Black women may dissuade them from seeking care. Inadequate prenatal care is associated with poor pregnancy outcomes such as low birth weight, preterm birth, and infant mortality. According to the Listening to Mothers III Survey, 40% of minority participants experienced communication issues and nearly one-quarter of minority mothers felt discriminated against during birth hospitalization. The same survey revealed that Black and Hispanic mothers were nearly three times more likely to experience discrimination in the healthcare system due to their race, language or culture. These issues are exacerbating the observed maternal and infant morbidity and mortality disparity between minority mothers and White mothers in the United States.

Another factor contributing to the increased maternal and infant morbidity and mortality rates in African American women is the hospital quality. According to a 2018 study, African American women and undocumented women tend to deliver in lower quality hospitals than White women. Hospitals where black women delivered had higher morbidity rates for both Black and White women. One study found that if African American women had delivered in the same hospitals as White women typically do, their severe maternal morbidity rate would decrease from 4.2% to 2.9%.

The US has been shown to have the highest rate of pregnancy-related maternal mortality among industrialized countries. Since 1986, maternal mortality rates have increased from 7.2 deaths per 100,000 in 1987, to 17.2 in 2015. The following statistics were retrieved from the CDC and show the rate of maternal mortality between 2011 and 2015 per 100000 live births: Black non-Hispanic – 42.8, American Indian/Alaskan Native non-Hispanic – 32.5, Asian/Pacific Islander non-Hispanic – 14.2, White non-Hispanic – 13.0, and Hispanic – 11.4.

According to Harriet Washington, author of Medical Apartheid, much of the Black maternal mortality crisis is predicated on a historical myth that Black people cannot feel pain. Washington asserts medical practice and literature remain from times of slavery. Washington points out medical figures like J Marion Sims, the "father of gynecology" and once President of the American Medical Association. Sims believed that black people did not feel as much pain as white people.

==== VBAC calculator ====
Since 2007, obstetricians create birth plans for patients who have had a previous C-section, using a calculator for the probability of a successful vaginal birth, or VBAC (vaginal birth after caesarean). The tool takes into account demographics including the patient's age, height, weight, and their obstetric history.

The original VBAC calculator also had two race based correction factors, for African American and Hispanic patients, that "subtract" from the likelihood of successful vaginal birth. Although race does not have an influence on biological composition, it has been used to assess a woman's probability of successful vaginal birth after receiving a C section. This subtraction is only based on race, and has put Hispanic and Black women in riskier situations than their white counterparts.

The VBAC calculator was endorsed by the National Institute of Child Health and Human Development, and was created in attempts to assist providers in their risk assessment for a patient's vaginal birth plan. This calculator accounts for various risk factors, including age, BMI, and previous health complications, which could have impacts on a woman's birth outcomes. However, the inclusion of race/ethnicity as a factor can create disparities in pregnancy outcomes. According to the VBAC calculator, a 30-year-old woman, with a prior cesarean delivery has a predicted chance of successful vaginal birth of 66.1% if White, but only 49.9% if Black. In most cases, vaginal birth can have positive implications, like avoidance of surgery and surgical complications, lower risk of postpartum hemorrhage and infection, faster recovery time, and lower risk of complications during subsequent pregnancies. Subjecting people of color as ineligible to receiving the safer pregnancy outcome can be highly detrimental to the safety of some pregnant patients.

In 2021, researchers decided to update the calculator to remove any question of race. The updated tool performs with the same level of accuracy as the previous version, and stays true to its original purpose of giving all pregnant patients the best level of care. In fact, the calculator includes a new, more objective clinical variable: whether or not a patient has been treated for chronic hypertension, which can impact the amount of blood flow to the placenta. Factoring hypertension, along with all other applicable demographics, can help create the safest and most effective birth plan for pregnant patients.

==== Income ====
It is estimated that 99% of women give birth in hospitals with fees that average between $8,900–$11,400 for vaginal delivery and between $14,900–$20,100 for a cesarean. Many women cannot afford these high costs, nor can they afford private health insurance, and even waiting on government-funded care can prove to be fatal, since delays to coverage usually result in women not getting the care they need from the start.

=== Other risk factors ===
Some other risk factors include obesity, chronic high blood pressure, increased age, diabetes, cesarean delivery, and smoking. Attending less than 10 prenatal visits is also associated with a higher risk of maternal mortality.

Researchers have found that another factor contributing to the elevated maternal mortality rates in the United States is the lack of attention given to black women during childbirth and the failure to recognize preexisting health conditions like diabetes and hypertension, which can cause preeclampsia and eclampsia. Despite the epidemic level of maternal mortality among black women, several states, like California, are working to lower the numbers.

Even in cases where they had never before experienced chronic hypertension, Black women are more likely to pass away from hemorrhage, cardiomyopathy, and hypertensive diseases of pregnancy than Hispanic women are (Howell, 2018). A national study examined the death rates from pregnancy in white and black women. The study found that for five particular pregnancy problems, the death risk was 2.4 to 3.3 times higher among black women. Preeclampsia, placenta abruptio, placenta previa, and postpartum hemorrhage were among them (Howell, 2018).

The Healthy People 2010 goal was to reduce the c-section rate to 15% for low-risk first-time mothers, but that goal was not met and the rate of c-sections has been on the rise since 1996 and reached an all-time high in 2009 at 32.9%. Excessive and non-medically necessary cesareans can lead to complications that contribute to maternal mortality.

== Overall and by race, age, ethnicity ==
=== Table ===
Maternal mortality rates: Deaths per 100,000 live births. By race and Hispanic origin and age: United States, 2018–2023.

Maternal mortality rates: Deaths per 100,000 live births. By race and Hispanic origin and age: United States, 2018–2023.
Race, Hispanic origin, age	2018	2019	2020	2021	2022	2023
Total^{1}	17.4	20.1	23.8	32.9	22.3	18.6
Younger than 25	10.6	12.6	13.8	20.4	14.4	12.5
25–39	16.6	19.9	22.8	31.3	21.1	18.1
40 and older	81.9	75.5	107.9	138.5	87.1	59.8
Asian, non-Hispanic^{2}	13.3	13.8	12.3	16.8	13.2	10.7
Younger than 25	*	*	*	*	*	*
25–39	11.8	13.3	10.4	12.7	10.9	8.9
40 and older	*	*	*	*	*	*
Black, non-Hispanic^{2}	37.3	44.0	55.3	69.9	49.5	50.3
Younger than 25	15.3	18.8	28.8	41.5	31.3	28.0
25–39	38.2	49.7	56.3	69.3	49.2	53.6
40 and older	239.9	166.5	263.1	300.8	174.5	132.9
White, non-Hispanic^{2}	14.9	17.9	19.1	26.6	19.0	14.5
Younger than 25	10.5	13.1	11.5	16.9	10.8	8.4
25–39	13.8	16.8	17.6	24.5	17.9	13.8
40 and older	72.0	75.2	96.8	126.9	83.9	56.6
Hispanic	11.8	12.6	18.2	28.0	16.9	12.4
Younger than 25	7.6	8.5	7.7	14.1	9.5	10.1
25–39	12.4	12.2	19.2	30.8	16.9	12.0
40 and older	38.6	57.3	86.0	86.4	70.7	35.8
* Estimate does not meet National Center for Health Statistics standards of reliability.^{1}Total includes deaths for race and Hispanic-origin groups not shown separately, including women of multiple races and Hispanic origin not stated.^{2}Race groups are single race. NOTES: Maternal causes are those assigned to codes A34, O00–O95, and O98–O99 of the International Classification of Diseases, 10th Revision. Maternal deaths occur while pregnant or within 42 days of being pregnant. People of Hispanic origin may be of any race. SOURCES: National Center for Health Statistics, National Vital Statistics System, mortality and natality data files.

=== More info ===
According to the US Centers for Disease Control and Prevention (CDC), the maternal mortality rate in 2023 was 50.3 per 100,000 live births for Black women, compared with 14.5 for white women and 12.4 for Hispanic women. More broadly, the U.S. has one of the highest maternal mortality rates among wealthy nations—18.6 deaths per 100,000 live births. Meanwhile, countries like Norway, Ireland, Switzerland, and Italy report fewer than three per 100,000 live births.

== Prevention ==
Inconsistent obstetric practice, increase in women with chronic conditions, and lack of maternal health data all contribute to maternal mortality in the United States. According to a 2015 WHO editorial, a nationally implemented guideline for pregnancy and childbirth, along with easy and equal access to prenatal services and care, and active participation from all 50 states to produce better maternal health data are all necessary components to reduce maternal mortality. The Hospital Corporation of America has also found that a uniform guideline for birth can improve maternal care overall. This would ultimately reduce the amount of maternal injury, c-sections, and mortality. The UK has had success drastically reducing preeclampsia deaths by implementing a nationwide standard protocol. However, no such mandated guideline currently exists in the United States.

To prevent maternal mortality moving forward, Amnesty International suggests these steps:

1. Increase government accountability and coordination
2. Create a national registry for maternal and infant health data while incorporating intersections of gender, race, and social/economic factors
3. Improve maternity care workforce
4. Improve diversity in maternity care
5. Public health sector/government (federal/state/local level) should collaborate with the local community leaders in creating more awareness of maternal mortality rate in local communities.
6. Enlighten women on importance of early prenatal care registration.

According to the U.S. Department of Health and Human Services, Centers for Disease Control and Prevention, National Center for Health Statistics, out-of-hospital births (such as home births and birthing centers with midwifery assistance) "generally provided a lower risk profile than hospital births." Consistent home-nurse visitations have been found to reduce mortality both in infants and their mothers.

Procedures such as episiotomies and cesareans, while helpful in some cases, when administered unnecessarily increase the risk of maternal death. Midwifery and mainstream obstetric care can be complementary, which is commonly the case in Canada, where women have a wide arrange of pregnancy and birthing options, wherein informed choice and consent are fundamental tenets of their reformed maternity care. The maternal mortality rate is two times lower in Canada than the United States, according to a global survey conducted by the United Nations and the World Bank.

Gender bias, implicit bias, and obstetric violence in the medical field are also important factors when discussing maternal wellness, care, and death in the United States.

Addressing socioeconomic, racial, and age disparities in clinical practices is another critical step in reducing maternal mortality in vulnerable groups. Organizations should work to reduce inequities identified within health care systems and in clinical practices. The Center for Reproductive Rights and Black Mamas Matter Alliance partnered to develop a toolkit to address racial disparities in public health outcomes. The toolkit includes policy recommendations that can be used to adapt to local priorities. In order to improve maternal health outcomes, all planned initiatives need to focus on both the medical systems and on social justice to reverse the role of social determinates of health and implicit bias in the US health care systems.

Telehealth implementation can improve access to care for rural communities and has been shown to improve maternal health outcomes.

According to the Centers for Disease and Prevention, state prevention strategies are best developed using data from Maternal Mortality Review Committees.

== Comparisons by state ==
=== Table. 2018-2023. Effect of COVID-19 ===
Table is from January 2026 article from American Journal of Obstetrics and Gynecology.

From the article: "Maternal deaths were identified using (2018–2023) mortality data from the National Vital Statistics System (NVSS). A maternal death is defined as the death of a woman while pregnant or within 42 days of termination of pregnancy, irrespective of the duration and the site of the pregnancy, from any cause related to or aggravated by the pregnancy or its management, but not from accidental or incidental causes."

And concerning COVID-19 in the US: "COVID-19 accounted for 12% of maternal deaths in 2020, 36% of maternal deaths in 2021, and 11% of maternal deaths in 2022. ... Maternal mortality rates peaked in 2021 across all states, with increases largely reflecting maternal deaths involving COVID-19, but with variation in magnitude across states. In 2022–2023, maternal mortality rates in most states returned to levels that were similar to 2019 and 2020."

- Asterisks (*) indicate "Health in Area" or "Healthcare in Area" links in table below.

Maternal Mortality Rates (Maternal Deaths per 100,000 Live Births) and 95% Bayesian Credible Intervals by State and Year: 2018-2023.
Area	2023	2022	2021	2020	2019	2018
Alaska *	20.8 (12.9-33.7)	24.0 (14.9-38.6)	34.0 (21.3-54.3)	24.9 (15.4-40.0)	22.9 (14.3-37.0)	19.9 (12.4-32.3)
Alabama *	25.6 (18.8-34.4)	31.4 (23.4-41.8)	50.9 (39.4-66.1)	35.9 (27.1-47.5)	31.6 (23.8-42.2)	28.5 (21.3-38.5)
Arkansas *	28.9 (20.8-40.2)	30.6 (21.7-42.3)	49.9 (37.0-67.4)	37.9 (27.7-52.1)	31.3 (22.6-43.3)	30.1 (21.8-42.2)
Arizona	23.7 (17.8-31.5)	26.7 (20.2-35.2)	40.6 (31.5-52.2)	32.6 (25.1-42.8)	25.4 (19.2-33.6)	22.1 (16.6-29.4)
California *	9.4 (7.4-11.9)	11.7 (9.4-14.6)	12.6 (10.0-15.6)	9.9 (7.8-12.4)	10.6 (8.5-13.3)	10.1 (8.0-12.7)
Colorado *	13.7 (9.7-19.3)	16.9 (12.1-23.7)	22.3 (16.1-30.7)	17.5 (12.5-24.5)	15.7 (11.2-22.1)	12.3 (8.6-17.4)
Connecticut	15.3 (10.4-22.7)	16.9 (11.5-24.7)	23.7 (16.3-34.2)	18.9 (12.9-27.7)	16.3 (11.1-23.9)	14.2 (9.6-21.1)
Washington *	21.9 (13.5-35.7)	24.8 (15.3-40.2)	37.2 (23.3-59.8)	26.7 (16.5-43.1)	23.6 (14.6-38.3)	20.5 (12.7-33.4)
Delaware	14.6 (8.7-24.0)	17.5 (10.6-28.7)	26.0 (15.8-42.3)	19.8 (12.0-32.4)	15.8 (9.5-26.0)	14.3 (8.6-23.6)
Florida *	18.5 (14.7-23.2)	19.2 (15.1-24.0)	37.1 (30.9-44.8)	23.4 (18.8-29.0)	23.6 (19.1-29.4)	16.9 (13.3-21.3)
Georgia *	22.3 (17.2-28.7)	27.3 (21.4-34.7)	45.5 (37.0-56.2)	28.4 (22.1-36.0)	29.5 (23.3-37.6)	24.6 (19.3-31.7)
Hawaii *	15.1 (9.5-23.9)	17.4 (10.9-27.4)	26.5 (17.0-41.4)	18.8 (11.8-29.5)	16.9 (10.7-26.7)	14.2 (8.9-22.4)
Iowa *	16.9 (11.7-24.6)	19.3 (13.3-27.8)	31.3 (22.2-44.4)	20.4 (14.1-29.3)	16.6 (11.3-23.9)	15.9 (11.0-23.2)
Idaho *	17.1 (11.2-25.9)	20.8 (13.8-31.3)	28.4 (19.0-42.2)	22.0 (14.6-33.2)	17.8 (11.7-26.9)	16.2 (10.6-24.6)
Illinois	16.2 (12.3-21.5)	19.4 (14.9-25.4)	28.3 (22.3-36.1)	19.7 (15.1-25.6)	14.6 (10.9-19.3)	13.1 (9.7-17.3)
Indiana	25.0 (18.9-33.1)	29.3 (22.4-38.4)	41.2 (32.0-52.7)	31.5 (24.2-41.1)	27.1 (20.6-35.7)	23.4 (17.6-31.0)
Kansas	17.7 (12.2-25.6)	22.1 (15.4-31.8)	29.6 (20.8-41.9)	24.1 (16.9-34.6)	20.0 (13.9-28.9)	16.6 (11.4-24.1)
Kentucky	25.9 (19.0-35.2)	28.3 (20.6-38.1)	41.7 (31.2-55.2)	35.6 (26.7-47.7)	30.7 (22.9-41.6)	28.2 (20.9-38.7)
Louisiana	32.7 (24.6-44.0)	33.8 (25.2-44.7)	54.7 (42.5-70.6)	37.7 (28.5-49.6)	32.7 (24.6-43.4)	27.2 (20.2-36.4)
Massachusetts *	12.4 (8.8-17.5)	16.7 (12.0-23.3)	21.6 (15.7-29.5)	17.3 (12.5-24.1)	13.6 (9.6-18.9)	13.3 (9.5-18.8)
Maryland *	16.4 (11.8-22.6)	20.5 (15.1-28.0)	29.2 (21.8-39.0)	21.5 (15.8-29.2)	19.1 (14.0-26.1)	15.6 (11.3-21.5)
Maine	14.3 (8.6-23.4)	16.8 (10.2-27.5)	23.9 (14.6-38.7)	18.6 (11.3-30.4)	14.9 (9.0-24.3)	12.9 (7.8-21.1)
Michigan	15.3 (11.3-20.5)	18.3 (13.7-24.3)	24.1 (18.3-31.5)	22.5 (17.1-29.9)	16.4 (12.3-21.9)	15.1 (11.3-20.3)
Minnesota *	12.9 (9.1-18.6)	13.9 (9.8-19.7)	21.1 (15.2-29.3)	15.4 (11.0-21.8)	12.2 (8.5-17.3)	11.1 (7.8-15.8)
Missouri	20.5 (15.1-27.9)	21.5 (15.7-29.0)	31.7 (23.8-41.8)	30.2 (22.7-40.9)	20.2 (14.8-27.3)	18.0 (13.2-24.4)
Mississippi *	26.9 (19.1-37.6)	31.1 (22.1-43.0)	57.0 (42.4-77.5)	34.2 (24.6-47.0)	32.1 (23.3-44.6)	25.3 (18.0-35.3)
Montana *	23.5 (15.0-37.2)	27.7 (17.7-43.4)	39.7 (25.7-61.7)	29.4 (18.8-46.0)	24.5 (15.6-38.5)	21.7 (13.8-34.3)
North Carolina *	23.3 (18.1-30.2)	26.2 (20.5-33.5)	40.3 (32.4-50.4)	28.3 (22.2-36.1)	22.9 (17.6-29.5)	17.4 (12.9-22.8)
North Dakota *	17.2 (10.5-28.0)	20.3 (12.5-33.0)	30.0 (18.6-48.2)	22.8 (14.1-37.0)	19.8 (12.2-32.2)	15.8 (9.7-25.8)
Nebraska *	19.9 (13.5-29.5)	23.3 (15.8-34.2)	32.2 (22.0-46.6)	26.4 (18.1-38.8)	21.9 (14.8-32.3)	19.5 (13.2-28.9)
New Hampshire	15.5 (9.5-25.1)	19.4 (12.0-31.4)	28.0 (17.5-44.7)	20.2 (12.5-32.5)	16.5 (10.1-26.6)	14.4 (8.8-23.2)
New Jersey	18.9 (14.1-24.9)	25.0 (19.2-32.6)	32.9 (25.6-42.1)	26.4 (20.4-34.4)	20.7 (15.6-27.2)	21.1 (16.1-28.1)
New Mexico	19.9 (13.2-29.6)	23.6 (15.9-35.0)	41.3 (28.5-60.9)	25.9 (17.5-38.2)	20.9 (13.9-31.0)	18.6 (12.4-27.8)
Nevada	16.7 (11.4-24.5)	19.4 (13.3-28.1)	29.1 (20.4-41.5)	22.4 (15.5-32.4)	19.2 (13.3-28.0)	14.8 (10.0-21.6)
New York *	18.0 (14.2-22.7)	23.5 (18.9-29.3)	28.4 (23.1-34.8)	20.7 (16.4-25.9)	20.9 (16.8-26.1)	18.7 (15.0-23.6)
Ohio *	19.0 (14.5-24.7)	24.7 (19.3-31.7)	32.6 (25.8-40.9)	25.5 (20.0-32.6)	22.1 (17.2-28.5)	16.9 (12.8-22.0)
Oklahoma *	21.6 (15.5-29.9)	26.5 (19.3-36.4)	40.8 (30.5-54.9)	27.1 (19.6-37.0)	23.9 (17.3-32.8)	22.6 (16.4-31.4)
Oregon *	13.8 (9.4-20.2)	16.9 (11.6-24.6)	23.9 (16.7-34.1)	20.2 (14.0-29.4)	14.7 (10.1-21.4)	12.2 (8.2-17.9)
Pennsylvania	14.7 (11.1-19.6)	18.5 (14.2-24.3)	23.9 (18.5-30.7)	16.8 (12.6-22.0)	16.8 (12.8-22.1)	13.9 (10.4-18.4)
Rhode Island	16.7 (10.2-27.4)	19.7 (12.1-32.1)	28.0 (17.3-45.2)	21.8 (13.4-35.5)	17.8 (10.8-29.0)	15.4 (9.4-25.2)
South Carolina *	23.4 (17.2-31.8)	29.4 (21.9-39.4)	42.3 (32.2-55.6)	31.5 (23.5-42.2)	27.2 (20.1-36.7)	23.2 (17.0-31.6)
South Dakota	18.2 (11.4-29.1)	22.8 (14.3-36.3)	34.2 (21.8-53.9)	24.7 (15.5-39.3)	20.2 (12.6-32.1)	18.2 (11.4-29.2)
Tennessee	30.9 (23.8-40.2)	37.5 (29.2-48.1)	57.4 (46.0-71.8)	44.6 (35.1-57.1)	31.0 (23.5-40.2)	28.0 (21.3-36.6)
Texas *	23.5 (19.8-28.0)	27.8 (23.7-32.8)	42.5 (36.9-48.9)	31.0 (26.4-36.4)	20.5 (16.9-24.7)	19.5 (16.1-23.5)
Utah *	12.3 (8.4-18.0)	15.2 (10.4-21.9)	23.3 (16.5-33.2)	15.7 (10.8-22.6)	15.3 (10.6-22.3)	11.4 (7.7-16.6)
Virginia *	22.4 (16.8-29.4)	35.6 (27.8-46.3)	45.4 (36.2-57.2)	30.5 (23.6-39.3)	24.7 (18.8-32.1)	20.7 (15.5-27.2)
Vermont *	12.9 (7.1-22.8)	15.3 (8.4-27.0)	22.0 (12.1-38.5)	16.6 (9.1-29.2)	14.3 (7.9-25.3)	12.2 (6.7-21.5)
Washington *	14.0 (10.1-19.2)	15.5 (11.1-21.1)	23.8 (17.7-31.7)	19.0 (14.0-25.7)	18.5 (13.6-25.5)	14.0 (10.3-19.3)
Wisconsin	13.6 (9.6-19.5)	16.0 (11.4-22.7)	21.5 (15.5-29.8)	16.3 (11.5-22.9)	13.3 (9.3-18.8)	10.9 (7.5-15.5)
West Virginia *	20.6 (13.5-31.6)	23.3 (15.3-35.4)	34.4 (22.9-51.6)	25.5 (16.8-38.7)	21.4 (14.0-32.5)	19.4 (12.7-29.7)
Wyoming	23.7 (14.3-40.0)	26.9 (16.2-45.0)	36.9 (22.3-61.0)	28.0 (16.9-46.6)	23.7 (14.3-39.6)	20.6 (12.3-34.5)

=== D.C. Maternal Health ===
The District of Columbia's maternal mortality rate rivals the national average, while also having severe disparities across race. According to the District's Racial Equity Dashboard, it has 43 maternal deaths per 100,000 live births. While black women in the district have a ratio of 79 maternal deaths per 100,000 live births. Black women encompass 84% of maternal deaths in D.C. Most of the maternal deaths occur in wards 7 and 8, which are majority black wards. Additionally, in 2019, 21.6% of Black D.C. residents were below the federal poverty line, compared to 5.1% of whites. There is only one major hospital serving wards 7 and 8 in D.C. compared to two in Ward 2, a majority white ward. These disparities intersect to impact the high rate of maternal mortality overall in D.C. and especially among Black people.

=== More info on states and more ===
The US has one of the highest maternal mortality rates in the Western Hemisphere. US hospital bills for maternal healthcare total over $32 billion.

Maternal mortality is one of the health issues that can be prevented if addressed appropriately. However, the lack of health professionals has limited access to healthcare, especially in communities where residents lack knowledge of and access to preventative measures. This is a gap in healthcare that needs to be addressed for further prevention, especially as the demand for maternal healthcare workers was expected to increase by 6% by 2020. The shortage of maternal healthcare workers is prevalent throughout the country, where as of 2016, 46 percent of US counties have no OB-GYNs and 56 percent have no nurse midwives, according to data from the US Department of Health and Human Services.

In the United States, maternal mortality has been increasing in the South in the 21st century, specifically in Georgia. The Spotlight on Poverty states that, as of 2024, 693,000 Hispanic and Black Americans are below 200% level in Georgia, and 19% of Georgian children live in poverty. Living in poverty does increase the chances of maternal mortality because women and children do not have the finances to travel to areas in Georgia that have healthcare access.

Differences in Medicaid coverage also factor into disparities in maternal mortality, given that over 40% of births nationally are covered by Medicaid, which is administered by state governments and therefore can vary based on location. Currently, all pregnant people at or below 138% of the federal poverty level qualify for Medicaid coverage; however, states can choose to include pregnant people with higher incomes, or allow people to receive covered healthcare temporarily while their application is still being processed. Some state-by-state variations consist of eligibility to qualify for Medicaid, which services fall under the umbrella of covered prenatal and maternity care and how patients are reimbursed for care they receive. Medicaid coverage affects birthing parents from the process of receiving prenatal care through birth and postpartum care, although not all states cover the same range of prenatal services or offer postpartum care after the federally mandated 60-day period. Expansion of care past the 60-day period may prevent some pregnancy-related deaths, 11.7% of which occur between 42 days and 1 year. Only 29 states had expanded this coverage period as of March 2023, with others proposing some sort of extension. As of September 2022, 12 states had not implemented any Medicaid expansions.

Another difference is in how much of the state's hospitals are considered rural, since rural hospitals are 6% less likely to offer delivery services than urban hospitals. Rural hospitals also have higher rates of Cesarean sections, which can increase the risk of complications for the person giving birth, although why rates are higher is still unclear.

== Comparisons with other countries ==
Comparison of the US maternal death rate to the death rate in other countries is complicated by the lack of standardization. Some countries do not have a standard method for reporting maternal deaths and some count in statistics death only as a direct result of pregnancy.

In the 1950s, the maternal mortality rate in the United Kingdom and the United States was the same. By 2018, the rate in the UK was one-third of that in the United States due to implementing a standardized protocol. In 2010, Amnesty International published a 154-page report on maternal mortality in the United States. In 2011, the United Nations described maternal mortality as a human rights issue at the forefront of American healthcare, as the mortality rates worsened over the years. According to a 2015 WHO report, in the United States the MMR between 1990 and 2013 "more than doubled from an estimated 12 to 28 maternal deaths per 100,000 births." By 2015, the United States had a higher MMR than the "Islamic Republic of Iran, Libya and Turkey". In the 2017 NPR and ProPublica series "Lost Mothers: Maternal Mortality in the U.S." based on a six-month long collaborative investigation, they reported that the United States has the highest rate of maternal mortality than any other developed country, and it is the only country where mortality rate has been rising. The maternal mortality rate in the United States is three times higher than that in neighboring Canada and six times higher than in Scandinavia. As of 2020, the United States maternal mortality rate was two times higher than Canada and 10 times higher than New Zealand's.

In the United States specifically, maternal mortality is still a prevalent issue in health care. From the year 2003 to 2013, only 8 countries worldwide saw an increase of the maternal mortality rate. The United States was included in this group, seeing an increase in the pregnancy-related mortality ratio over the past 3 decades. Looking at the years 1990-2013 from a world-wide perspective, the United States of America was the only country to see an increase in the maternal mortality rate over this time period.

The US has the worst rate of maternal deaths in the developed world. The US has the "highest rate of maternal mortality in the industrialized world." In the United States, the maternal death rate averaged 9.1 maternal deaths per 100,000 live births during the years 1979–1986, but then rose rapidly to 14 per 100,000 in 2000 and 17.8 per 100,000 in 2009. In 2013 the rate was 18.5 deaths per 100,000 live births. It has been suggested that the rise in maternal death in the United States may be due to improved identification and misclassification resulting in false positives. The rate has steadily increased to 18.0 deaths per 100,000 live births in 2014. Between 2011 and 2014, there were 7,208 deaths that were reported to the CDC that occurred for women within a year of the end of their pregnancy. Out of this there were 2,726 that were found to be pregnancy-related deaths.

Since 2016, ProPublica and NPR investigated factors that led to the increase in maternal mortality in the United States. They reported that the "rate of life-threatening complications for new mothers in the U.S. has more than doubled in two decades due to pre-existing conditions, medical errors and unequal access to care." According to the Centers for Disease Control and Prevention, c. 4 million women who give birth in the US annually, over 50,000 a year, experience "dangerous and even life-threatening complications."

According to a report by the United States Centers for Disease Control and Prevention, in 1993 the rate of Severe Maternal Morbidity, rose from 49.5 to 144 "per 10,000 delivery hospitalizations" in 2014, an increase of almost 200 percent. Blood transfusions also increased during the same period with "from 24.5 in 1993 to 122.3 in 2014 and are considered to be the major driver of the increase in SMM. After excluding blood transfusions, the rate of SMM increased by about 20% over time, from 28.6 in 1993 to 35.0 in 2014."

The past 60 years have consistently shown considerable racial disparities in pregnancy-related deaths. Between 2011 and 2014, the mortality ratio for different racial populations based on pregnancy-related deaths was as follows: 12.4 deaths per 100,000 live births for white women, 40.0 for black women, and 17.8 for women of other races. This shows that black women have between three and four times greater chance of dying from pregnancy-related issues. It has also been shown that one of the major contributors to maternal health disparities within the United States is the growing rate of non-communicable diseases. In addition, women of color have not received equal access to healthcare professionals and equal treatment by those professionals.

"Black women's poor reproductive outcomes are often seen as a women's personal failure. For example, Black women's adverse birth outcomes are typically discussed in terms of what the women do, such as drinking alcohol, smoking, and having less than optimal eating habits that lead to obesity and hypertension. They may be seen to be at risk based on the presumption that they are 'single,' when in fact they have a partner- but are unmarried.". Black women in the United States are dying at higher rates than white women in the United States. The United States has one of the worst maternal mortality rates despite it being a developed nation.

It is unclear why pregnancy-related deaths in the United States have increased. It seems that the use of computerized data servers by the states and changes in the way deaths are coded, with a pregnancy checkbox added to death certificates in many states, have been shown to improve the identification of these pregnancy-related deaths. Before 2016, there was not a standardized way to report maternal deaths in the United States. Each state was using a different method causing variation in MMR across the country. As more and more states implemented the checkbox, however, there was a large increase in the number of maternal deaths reported. However, this does not contribute to decreasing the actual number of deaths. Also, errors in reporting of pregnancy status have been seen, which most likely leads to an overestimation of the number of pregnancy-related deaths. Again, this does not contribute to explaining why the death rate has increased but does show complications between reporting and actual contributions to the overall rate of maternal mortality.

Even though 99% of births in the United States are attended by some form of skilled health professional, the maternal mortality ratio in 2015 was 14 deaths per 100,000 live births and it has been shown that the maternal mortality rate has been increasing. Also, the United States is not as efficient at preventing pregnancy-related deaths when compared to most of the other developed nations.

The United States took part in the Millennium Development Goals (MDGs) set forth from the United Nations. The MDGs ended in 2015 but were followed-up in the form of the Sustainable Development Goals starting in 2016. The MDGs had several tasks, one of which was to improve maternal mortality rates globally. Despite their participation in this program as well as spending more than any other country on hospital-based maternal care, however, the United States has still seen increased rates of maternal mortality. This increased maternal mortality rate was especially pronounced in relation to other countries who participated in the program, where during the same period, the global maternal mortality rate decreased by 44%. Also, the United States is not currently on track to meet the Healthy People 2020 goal of decreasing maternal mortality by 10% by the year 2020 and continues to fail in meeting national goals in maternal death reduction. Only 23 states have some form of policy that establishes review boards specific to maternal mortality as of the year 2010.

In an effort to respond to the maternal mortality rate in the United States, the CDC requests that the 52 reporting regions (all states and New York City and Washington, DC) send death certificates for all those women who have died and may fit their definition of pregnancy-related death, as well as copies of the matching birth or death records for the infant. However, this request is voluntary and some states may not have the ability to abide by this effort.

The Affordable Care Act (ACA) provided additional access to maternity care by expanding opportunities to obtain health insurance for the uninsured and mandating that certain health benefits have coverage. It also expanded the coverage for women who have private insurance. This expansion allowed them better access to primary and preventative health care services, including for screening and management of chronic diseases. An additional benefit for family planning services was the requirement that most insurance plans cover contraception without cost-sharing. However, more employers are able to claim exemptions for religious or moral reasons under the current administration. Also under the current administration, the Department of Health and Human Services (HHS) has decreased funding for pregnancy prevention programs for adolescent girls.

Those women covered under Medicaid are covered when they receive prenatal care, care received during childbirth, and postpartum care. These services are provided to nearly half of the women who give birth in the United States. Currently, Medicaid is required to provide coverage for women whose incomes are at 133% of the federal poverty level in the United States.

There are many possible reasons why the United States has a much larger MMR than other developed countries: many hospitals are unprepared for maternal emergencies, 44% of maternal-fetal grants do not go towards the health of the mother, and pregnancy complication rates are continually increasing.

== See also ==
- Maternal death
- Infant mortality
- Perinatal mortality
- Black maternal mortality in the United States
- Obstetric transition
- The Business of Being Born, a 2008 documentary
- Confidential Enquiry into Maternal Deaths in the UK
- List of women who died in childbirth
- Reproductive rights
- Women's reproductive health in the United States
- Rural health
