= Women's reproductive health in the United States =

Women's reproductive health in the United States refers to the set of physical, mental, and social issues related to the health of women in the United States. It includes the rights of women in the United States to adequate sexual health, available contraception methods, and treatment for sexually transmitted diseases. The prevalence of women's health issues in American culture is inspired by second-wave feminism in the United States. As a result of this movement, women of the United States began to question the largely male-dominated health care system and demanded a right to information on issues regarding their physiology and anatomy. The U.S. government has made significant strides to propose solutions, like creating the Women's Health Initiative through the Office of Research on Women's Health in 1991. However, many issues still exist related to the accessibility of reproductive healthcare as well as the stigma and controversy attached to sexual health, contraception, and sexually transmitted diseases.

The Department of Health and Human Services has developed a definition for sexual health in the United States based on the World Health Organization's definition of sexual health.

"Sexual health is a state of well-being in relation to sexuality across the life span that involves physical, emotional, mental, social and spiritual dimensions. Sexual health is an intrinsic element of human health and is based on positive, equitable, and respectful approach to sexuality, relationships, and reproduction, that is free of coercion, fear, discrimination, stigma, shame, and violence.

The United States government recognizes that gender is a factor which plays a significant role in sexual health.

Partially influenced by second-wave feminism, women in the U.S. challenged the male dominated healthcare system while also demanding better information and autonomy over their bodies. Initiatives such as the Women’s Health Initiative have improved awareness and research, however, significant barriers still remain. Those barriers include limited access to reproductive services, stigma surrounding sexual health, contraception, and STIs.

== Race and reproductive health ==
In the United States, reproductive health disparities exist between white and minority women. Historical abuses and experimentation on Black women by medical professionals has led to greater distrust of the medical community. Additionally, current racial biases held by medical personnel affect medical care of Black and minority women. Compared to white women, the rate of HIV infection is disproportionately high in Black and Hispanic women. These groups account for 75% of infection among women. There is also a gap in contraceptive use between white and Black women. These disparities are partly due to lack of health insurance and financial costs. Comprehensive gynecological care can also help reduce the rates of HIV in minority women and increase contraceptive use. The lack of reproductive health is a contributing factor in higher rates of maternal mortality in the United States among minority women, especially among Black women. Black women are 3.3 times more likely than white women to die from pregnancy-related causes. This is partly due to lack of insurance before pregnancy and higher rates of chronic conditions, such as obesity and diabetes. Furthermore, there are disparities in the use and success of ART among racial and socio-economic groups given the high costs, limited access, and varied utilization. A review of all U.S. studies that considered race and ethnicity when reporting success rates for ART, found white women consistently had the highest success rates, followed by Hispanic and Asian women, and African American women. An African American women does not receive the same treatment as a white women due to the age they were diagnosed at, the household income, and the specific treatment facility.

== Contraception ==
The U.S. Department of Health and Human Services has identified national reproductive health goals including reducing the level of unintended pregnancy. Out of all the pregnancies reported in the United States, half are unplanned. Of the 62 million women in the U.S. who are able to have children, seven out of ten of these women are sexually active but do not want to become pregnant. Contraception is a major issue of women's reproductive health. 86% of sexually active women practice some form of contraception and 30% of these women use a hormonal form of contraception. Women in the U.S. have more freedoms in deciding their use of contraceptives among other global nations, comparatively.

The Centers for Disease Control (CDC) has significant pull over the decision-making process women must make when choosing different types of contraception. Women of the U.S. still rely on their healthcare providers for the majority of information they receive about contraceptive use. In order to help healthcare providers provide appropriate family planning care, the CDC published the US Medical Eligibility Criteria for Contraceptive Use, 2010. The CDC lists methods of birth control under two categories: reversible and permanent.

=== Reversible methods of birth control ===
- Copper T intrauterine device (IUD) or levonorgestrel intrauterine system (LNG IUD)
- Hormonal methods
  - Implant
  - Injection
  - Combined oral contraceptives
  - Progestin-only pill
  - Patch
  - Hormonal vaginal contraceptive ring
  - Emergency contraception
- Barrier methods
  - Diaphragm or cervical cap
  - Male condom
  - Female condom
  - Spermicides
- Fertility awareness-based methods
  - Family planning
  - Fertility awareness
  - Abstinence

=== Permanent methods of birth control ===
- Female sterilization
- Transcervical sterilization

=== Hormonal contraception ===
Hormonal contraception is the most popular method of contraception among women in the United States. Women under the age of thirty more commonly use hormonal oral contraception as their preferred method. Hormonal contraceptives are highly effective when used under perfect conditions, however in many cases there can be third factors which can lead to an increase in the failure rate. The popularity of oral hormonal contraceptives among women changes over the course of a year with 32% of women deciding to discontinue use of an oral hormonal contraceptive after one year of typical use. The reason for discontinuation frequently lies within side effects that women receive after prolonged use of oral hormonal contraceptives that can often drastically alter a woman's health both physically and mentally.

=== Intrauterine contraception ===
There are two types of IUDs that exist for current contraceptive use: Copper T 380A and levonorgestrel-releasing intrauterine system or Mirena. The effectiveness of a contraceptive is described in terms of perfect use and typical use. An IUD is different than most forms of contraception, as it is 100% effective in both cases of use. It is not possible to use IUDs improperly or inconsistently because they must be inserted inside of the uterus. Due to the under researched nature of the procedure, some women in the United States have worried about the use of IUDs, making them a less popular form of contraception. For many women in the U.S., IUDs are only an option when other traditional contraception methods have been used (hormonal birth control, barrier methods, etc.) or when a woman has already had children. The fear surrounding use of an IUD stems from a lack of proper education on all available contraception options available to women in the U.S.. Women have cited being afraid of the quality of the device itself, placing the device inside their bodies voluntarily, and the time required to hold the device in place. There is a lack of knowledge about female anatomy and pregnancy prevention, even among women of the United States.

=== Fertility awareness based models ===
Fertility awareness based methods consist of non-hormonal or invasive contraceptive methods. These take the form of only having sex when a woman isn't fertile, thus avoiding having sex during ovulation. Women can monitor her menstrual cycle pattern using calendar-based methods or symptoms-based methods. The most effective calendar-based method is the Standard Days Method, a method in which the woman doesn't have sexual intercourse on days 8-19 of her cycle. One symptoms-based method is the TwoDay Method, a method where the woman checks for secretions twice a day and if she has had vaginal secretions that day or the day prior, she can potentially get pregnant. A second symptoms-based method is the Sympto-thermal method, which combines a woman's observations of her vaginal secretions with the use of an electric hormonal fertility monitor which detects urine hormones. One benefit of using fertility awareness based method is that there are no side effects or health issues as no drugs or implants are used.

== Reproductive mental health ==
Women's reproductive mental health focuses on mental health issues that are experienced on account of or exacerbated by transitions in female reproductive cycles. This field is a subset of women's mental health, which includes mental health issues faced by women at all points in their life. Reproductive mental health specifically focuses on reproductive transitions in female life. These include puberty, menstruation, pregnancy, infertility, perimenopause and menopause, abortion, and more. These transitions, brought on by hormonal changes, can trigger emotional and physical symptoms in some women. While the severity ranges from person to person, it was reported that over 75% of women with regular menstrual cycles report unpleasant physical or psychological symptoms, premenstrually. Reproductive psychiatry is the subset that is focused on treating these issues. These clinicians are trained experts in the diagnosis and treatment of mood and anxiety symptoms that occur throughout these cycles in female reproduction. This field is growing as the current gap in mental health specifically focused on women and their reproductive cycles is realised and people see how impactful studying these issues can be.

=== Sexual health and contraception ===
Sexual health includes sexual development and reproductive health, the ability to have strong interpersonal relationships, appreciate one's body, interact appropriately with both genders, and express love, affection, and intimacy in ways consistent with one's own values. Sexual health also includes intercourse that is "consensual, non-exploitative, honest, pleasurable, and protected against unintended pregnancy and STDs" according to the 2008 World Health Organization (WHO) consensus statement. For most young people, sexual interest begins at the time of puberty and there is evidence that those who get sexual health information from their parents are more likely to initiate sexual activity later than those who get it from their peers although some young people prefer to get information from professionals.

Contraception is used to prevent pregnancy. It is the means by which people can family plan so that they have their optimal number of children with their desired spacing. According to WHO, contraceptives help lower maternal ill-health and the number of deaths related to pregnancy. It also reduces unsafe abortions and reduces HIV transmission between the mother and children. According to the CDC, couples need to consider safety, effectiveness, availability, and acceptability when choosing their form of contraception. Some forms of contraception like the use of male condoms also help lessen the transmission of HIV and other STDs while other forms of contraception like intra-uterine devices (IUDs) do not.

Intra-uterine devices (IUDs) are a reversible form of contraception and includes the placing of a small T-shaped device made of copper inside the uterus. It releases a small amount of progestin each day so that the woman does not get pregnant. It can stay from 3–6 years and has a very low risk rate. Hormonal methods of contraception include an arm implant that releases progestin and can be used for around five years, an injection once in three months, combined oral contraceptives, progestin only pill, patch, and hormonal vaginal contraceptive ring. Barrier methods include a diaphragm or cervical cap, sponge, male and female condoms, and spermicides. Emergency contraception is not to be used regularly and prevents pregnancy after sexual intercourse. It includes a copper IUD and emergency contraceptive pills. Finally, permanent methods of contraception are female sterilization called tying tubes and male sterilization called a vasectomy.

=== Birth control ===
Birth control (BC) pills are oral hormonal pills that prevent a woman's ovaries from releasing eggs during ovulation. The side effects of birth control pills include acne, bleeding or spotting between periods, bloating, high blood pressure, depression, fatigue, dizziness, fluid retention, headache, increased appetite, insomnia, melasma, mood swings, nausea, breast pain and tenderness, vomiting, and weight gain. Health risks associated with BC include blood clots, gallbladder disease, heart attack, high blood pressure, liver cancer, and stroke although these are very uncommon according to Planned Parenthood. Estrogen containing pills also increase the likelihood of venous thrombosis compared to only progestin containing pills. They increase the risk from 2 to 10 venous thrombotic events per 10,000 women-years to 7 to 10 venous thrombotic events per 10,000 women-years.

Birth control can also affect mental health and there is recent evidence of a correlation between birth control use and mood disorders. Some studies have found correlations between use of BC and lifetime diagnoses of depression in adolescents. The mood effects are thought to be due to the reaction between estrogen and progestin and other mood-related neurotransmitters like serotonin and dopamine. Studies have found that hormonal contraceptive users had higher rates of depression, anxiety, fatigue, neurotic symptoms, sexual disturbances, compulsion, anger, and negative menstrual effects. For women with preexisting mental health conditions, it is advisable to talk to a psychiatrist before taking BC pills. Women may also benefit by speaking to a counselor.

=== Abortion ===
The link between abortion and mental health has become a controversial and political issue in the US. Some people claim that abortion causes mental health issues while others agree there is no scientific evidence to back up this claim. The term "post-abortion syndrome" was coined to refer negative psychological impacts following an abortion. The symptoms are based on post traumatic stress disorder; however, this diagnosis is not recognised by the American Psychological Association and is not included in the DSM. This disorder was pushed by pro-life movements and Crisis Pregnancy Centres, which were designed to talk women out of having abortions. There have been lots of studies conducted to examine the link between mental health and abortion. Many of these studies are very limited, and do not account for the impact of confounding variables, one of the biggest being pre-existing mental health issues prior to getting an abortion. One systematic review found a clear trend linking the highest quality studies with results that showed a neutral link, and the most flawed studied finding a link between abortion and negative mental health impacts. These findings are common amongst investigations that have gone back and looked through previous findings and analysed their methods and conclusions.

The Turnaway study was the first study to rigorously examine the effects of women being denied an abortion. Participants included nearly 100 women seeking abortions from 30 facilities across the country. Interviews were conducted over a 5 year period, and compared women who did receive a wanted abortion to those turned away because they passed the facilities gestational age limit. This study did not find any correlation between having an abortion and negative mental health impacts. In fact, it found that 95% of women report that the decision was the correct one for them over 5 years after the procedure. This study also showed the clear negative impacts of being denied a wanted abortion on women's general health and trajectory of life. Some of these negative impacts include being more likely to stay with abusive partners, being more likely to suffer anxiety and loss of self esteem, as well as serious implications for the children born of unwanted pregnancies and the existing children in the family, if any.

=== Postpartum period ===
The postpartum period has one of the highest rates of mental health issues associated with it, with 85% of women experiencing a mood disturbance. The current three categories of postpartum disorders include the postpartum blues, postpartum depression and postpartum psychosis.

Most women experience what has been named the postpartum blues, which is usually considered to be more mild and shorter lived than other disorders associated with the postpartum period. During the postpartum blues an individual may experience anxiety, irritability and mood swings. The postpartum blues are considered to be a relatively common and normal side effect of giving birth, especially in western countries where there is a lack of general community and familial support. The stress of delivery combined with changes in hormone levels is thought to contribute to the postpartum blues many people face after childbirth. It is thought that the postpartum blues are relatively common; however, if they last for more than 2 weeks individuals might be at risk for more severe postpartum disorders.

Postpartum depression (PDD) is a psychiatric disorder observed in the postpartum period. PDD can occur at any point after delivery but most commonly it onset 2–3 months after childbirth. PDD is nearly indistinguishable from regular depression; however, in PDD the negative thoughts and feelings are primarily centered on the newborn. PDD symptoms include feeling of guilt and incompetence, low mood, fatigue, poor concentration, anxiety and suicidal ideation. Hormone changes, marital dissatisfaction, and inadequate social support are all factors that contribute to experiences of PPD. Those with a history of mental health issues, such as major depressive disorder and bipolar disorder, are the most vulnerable to developing PDD after childbirth.

Postpartum psychosis (PP) is the most rare and severe disorder that can occur in the postpartum period. The development of PP is very abrupt and is usually observed within at least the first two weeks after childbirth, and symptoms can start as early as 24–48 hours after giving birth. Severe mood swings, as seen in bipolar disorder, are usually observed, as well as erratic behavior, confusion and delusional beliefs about the newborn. Auditory hallucinations can also occur in which the mother is instructed to harm herself or her child. Those with PP are at risk for suicide and potentially infanticide and must be treated in a hospital. There are resources available for PP survivors as well as those suffering from PP.

Other postpartum disorders include postpartum OCD, specific anxiety disorders, and postpartum PTSD. Postpartum OCD is characterized by obsessive thoughts and compulsions surrounding the health safety of the newborn as well as intrusive thoughts about harming the child. It is also thought that 5.6% of women show symptoms of postpartum PTSD, which can be characterized by flashbacks to childbirth, nightmares and tension and can occur when pregnant again. Maternity neurosis is another potential issue associated with the postpartum period, in which mothers are excessively anxious and worried about the health and safety of their child.

=== Perimenopause and menopause ===
Perimenopause is when a woman's monthly menstruation begins to decrease in her late 40s and early 50s. Perimenopause increases the risk of symptoms affecting mental health and can exacerbate previously diagnosed mental illnesses. The greatest evidence is for the recurrence and existence of depression. Studies also found that women with bipolar disorder were more likely to have depressive episodes during perimenopause. Perimenopause is also when women are at an increased risk for schizophrenia. Some women also show increased anxiety symptoms.

Menopause is when a woman's period stops and is unable to get pregnant naturally. This happens when a woman's ovaries age and are no longer able to make hormones necessary for reproduction. During menopause, the incidence of depression doubles. There is some evidence that women are more likely to have panic attacks during menopause. However, there is some difficulty differentiating panic attacks from hot flashes which are a common symptom of menopause. Many women also experience sleeping problems. Treatment options include antidepressants if diagnosed with depression. Other options that help are eating a balanced diet, exercising and practicing yoga.

=== Inequalities in mental healthcare ===
Not only are there gender disparities when it comes to mental health issues - women being twice as likely than men to suffer from mental illness, but there are also inequalities between white women and women of color when it comes to accessing mental health treatments. In 2017, women of color reported feelings of worthlessness, hopelessness and sadness almost twice as often as white women did. It is more likely that people of color and women of color specifically will be misdiagnosed and prescribed antipsychotics at higher rates, because of the racism and the implicit bias in the US healthcare system The stigma women of color face also adds to this inequality, with the idea of the "strong black women'' creating barriers for many that would benefit from mental health treatments. Asian Americans also face barriers, and are shown to be three times less likely to seek mental health treatment than their white counterparts in the U.S. Another factor that adds to the inequalities in mental health care is the lack of POC providers. APA data published in 2020 showed that less than 5% of mental healthcare providers were black, 4% are Asian American and 4% are Hispanic and only 2% of psychiatrists are black. The racial profiles of providers does not match the racial diversity of the U.S. which adds to the inequality and bias people of color and especially women of color can face when attempting to get mental health assistance.

== Reproductive problems ==
=== Pregnancy complications in women with polyendocrine metabolic ovarian syndrome (PMOS) ===
One in ten women of childbearing age in the U.S. are affected by polyendocrine metabolic ovarian syndrome (PMOS). Women with this condition are at a higher risk of experiencing complications during pregnancy. PMOS is a medical condition consisting of hyperandrogegism, ovarian dysfunction and polycystic ovarian morphology (PCOM). The hormonal imbalance caused by PMOS can cause the egg to not properly develop or be released as would otherwise normally occur during ovulation in a healthy menstrual cycle. In the past, research of PMOS has been focused on diagnostics, symptoms, and effects such as infertility. Very little research has been done concerning complications than can result when a woman with PMOS conceives. This is a very important condition to address as it can have major financial impacts on the lives of those diagnosed with PMOS. Currently, in the U.S. it can cost the healthcare system nearly four million dollar to treat women with PMOS, due to the many other conditions that PMOS can cause including: cardiovascular disease; pregnancy-induced hypertension and pre-eclampsia; miscarriage; infertility; and type 2 diabetes mellitus. There has also been some research conducted concerning the outcomes of the health of offspring born to mothers with PMOS. The results have proved inclusive, but they are thought to be at an increased risk of developing cardiovascular dysfunction and endocrine dysfunction.

=== Assisted reproductive technology ===
Infertility is an increasingly common issue among women of reproductive age. The CDC estimates 6% of women between the ages of 15 and 44 in the U.S. cannot get pregnant after one year of trying. Along with medicine and surgery, one growing treatment for infertility is assisted reproductive technology (ART). ART describes any method in which both eggs and embryos are manipulated outside the woman's body, of which in vitro fertilization (IVF) is the most common type. In 2015, 1.7% of all live births in the U.S. were the result of ART. While this method of conception is becoming more common, it is still a highly complex and debated issue. ART has been associated with many adverse health outcomes including an increased risk of birth defects, and a 1.71 increased risk of preeclampsia among women. Success rates for ART are improving yet vary significantly and are particularly dependent on age. For instance, for women younger than 35 the average success rate of ART in 2015 was 31% compared to 16% for those aged 38–40, and 3% for those over 44 years of age.

=== Infertility, pregnancy loss, birth trauma, and delivery of offspring ===
Infertility is a medical condition in which a woman can’t get pregnant after a year of trying, or 6 months for a woman over the age of 35. Women can also be considered infertile if they become pregnant but can’t stay pregnant. This condition affects about 10 percent of women in the United States. In addition to those women, men are also having trouble with infertility. According to the Office on Women’s Health “One third of fertility problems are due to the man.” Depending on if the infertility is caused by a man or a woman also changes the reason why the infertility is occurring.

There are many different reasons why infertility happens. For most women infertility is caused by issues with ovulation, age, tubal disorders, ovary disorders, uterine disorders, and uterine fibroids. Most men experience causes such as varicocele, creation of too few sperm or none, hormonal issues, and movement or shape of sperm. An increasingly large factor to infertility is age. Many women are choosing to wait to become pregnant until their 30s and 40s. This is a factor for infertility because the eggs a woman has can become unhealthy and the number of eggs a woman has left is very small by the age of 35. Depending on the cause of infertility, most cases can be treated.

Several effects of infertility, pregnancy loss, birth trauma, and delivery of offspring lead to a wide range of major health issues in women. In the US about 1 in 5 (19%) are unable to get pregnant after one year of trying to get pregnant. A qualitative study in Iran assessed the emotional-psychological consequences of infertility and concluded that it created psychological distress and caused depression in a subset of the women. A more quantitative study conducted by Penn University linked the association between infertility and mortality. The study revealed that women with a history of infertility have a 20 percent increased risk of cancer-related mortality, including increased risk of death from breast cancer and diabetes. pregnancy loss or miscarriages can also lead to increased risks of psychological and/or physical health problems. Miscarriages can create a greater risk of high blood pressure, cardiovascular diseases, and type 2 diabetes. About 3% also suffer from infections after a miscarriage. Depression and Anxiety disorders are the main mental health issues that arise after a pregnancy loss. In the case of a birth, certain traumas can occur. Some women who experience traumatic events during pregnancy develop postnatal post-traumatic stress disorder (PTSD) which is considered a type of anxiety disorder. In the case of a relatively normal delivery of offspring other health issues can arise. About 16% of pregnancies in 2019 had hypertensive disorders. Overall pregnancy mortality has been increasing over time and pregnancy-related mortality ratios for black women were more than three times higher than for white women. The top 5 causes of pregnancy death include cardiovascular conditions (16.2%), infection or sepsis (13.9%),cardiomyopathy (12.5%),hemorrhage (11.0%), thrombotic pulmonary or other embolism (9.4%). Overall pregnancy loss, trauma, delivery, and infertility can have a wide range of psychological and physiological major problems.

Treatment for infertility can be simple or extensive. Some women only need one or two treatments while others may need much more extensive treatment that can take months. The treatments for women include fertility medications, intrauterine insemination, and surgery to restore fertilization. Treatment for men can include lifestyle changes, medications, surgery, or sperm retrieval processes. One of the largest forms of assistance is In Vitro Fertilization. This process includes retrieving the egg, fertilizing it outside of the uterus, then placing it back into the uterus in order to promote growth. There are increasing numbers of this type of assistance in the U.S. every year.

== Sexually transmitted diseases ==
A health objective of the United States government through The United States Public Health Service is to reduce the number of cases of sexually transmitted diseases from the 1980s to today. The Centers for Disease Control is responsible for many studies on the topic of STDs as well as the effect of STDs on women and girls. STDs are defined by the CDC as "infections you can get from having sex with someone who has an infection". There are more than twenty types of identifiable STDs caused by bacteria, parasites, or viruses. Within one year in the United States there are an estimated 12 million cases of sexually transmitted diseases that occur. Of those 12 million cases there are 1.5 million cases of gonorrhea, 500,000 cases of genital herpes, and 110,000 cases of syphilis. Both women and men in the United States are affected by the STD epidemic. However, women have a stronger negative health reaction to some STDs than men. The negative health effects of STDs for women can include pelvic inflammatory disease (PIV), ectopic pregnancy, chronic pelvic pain, infertility, fetal and perinatal infections, complications to pregnancy, fetal loss, cervical cancer, and increased risk of tubal pregnancy, intrauterine growth retardation and preterm delivery. Women in the U.S. are less likely to seek out treatment for STDs for a variety of reasons. Some STDs appear asymptomatic in women therefore women are less likely to seek out treatment for STDs than men. Like most health topics, there is a gap that exists in understanding the pathology of diseases in women versus men. Women receive less than adequate information about the prevalence of STDs as well as the symptoms of STDs.

As with contraception in the U.S., a stigma exists which prevents women from learning about all possible STDs and their treatment. A study by the Journal of Women's Health identified STDs as a topic women would rather not talk about. Women, with their partners, do not commonly discuss STDs as well. The stigma surrounding STDs in the U.S. prevents women from discussing the topic even among healthcare provides, close friends, partners, and family. Younger women do not understand the risk that STDs can pose to them. For example, Chlamydia is one of the most common STDs affecting women and men in the United States. Women do not follow the recommendation that people should be screened for Chlamydia at least once per year. Most women do not even know any information about Chlamydia as an STD besides the fact that it is curable.

STD screening is most effective for identifying STDs in women, but is commonly underutilized by women in the U.S. Healthcare access and access to family planning clinics increases the probability that women will seek out and utilize STD screening. Screening is a form of testing healthy versus symptomatic people against traditional symptoms of STDs to determine STD prevalence. The Planned Parenthood Federation of America has available clinics across the United States for the purpose of screening for STDs as well as other family planning services. Planned Parenthood suggests that sexually active women screen for STDs at least annually. A study by the Journal for Women's Health identified a need for a knowledge campaign on STD screening targeting sexually active young women.
