= Healthcare in Texas =

This article summarizes healthcare in Texas. In 2022, the United Healthcare Foundation ranked Texas as the 38th healthiest state in the United States. Obesity, excessive drinking, maternal mortality, infant mortality, vaccinations, mental health, and limited access to healthcare are among the major public health issues facing Texas.

== Obesity ==
Texas possesses some of the highest rates of adult obesity in the United States. The Centers for Disease Control and Prevention claims that 35% to 40% of adult Texans were classified as obese in 2022, with higher rates of obesity being seen among Black and Hispanic populations. Obesity is a major leading risk factor for diabetes, hypertension, and heart disease in the state.

Obesity in Texas has had a substantial economic burden on state spending. The Texas Comptroller, there are estimates that obesity-related illness has costed the state billions of dollars annually in healthcare expenses and Medicaid spending. Texas continually invests in statewide obesity prevention programs and community-based nutrition education initiatives, in relatively small amounts.

=== Consequences of obesity ===
Obesity causes several chronic diseases including heart disease and diabetes. The three leading causes of death in Texas - heart disease, stroke, and cancer - are all linked to obesity. Additionally, obesity can cause type 2 diabetes, arteriosclerosis, and hypertension. In 2010, Texas saw 1,261,654 cases of heart disease and is predicted to see 5,688,482 cases in 2030. In 2010, Texas saw 1,962,059 cases of diabetes and is predicted to see 2,851,697 cases in 2030. In 2010, Texas saw 4,300,252 cases of hypertension and is predicted to see 5,689,509 cases in 2030. In 2010, Texas saw 328,379 cases of obesity-related cancer and is predicted to see 810,806 cases in 2030.

Obesity also has substantial impacts on the economy in Texas. Obesity costs Texas businesses $9.5 billion annually. 41% of this is due to obesity-related healthcare costs, 17% is due to absenteeism, and 37% is due to presenteeism.

=== Obesity treatment ===
Effective treatment for obesity is known to be expensive and difficult. For childhood obesity, programs tend to focus on creating lifestyle changes including a healthier diet and more exercise. Studies show that obesity treatment for children should aim more at changing the behavior of the family as a whole, especially the parents. Comprehensive weight loss programs for children in Texas have had limited success in reducing weight. For example, only 20% of children finish the Weigh of Life Program and many of them are likely to gain the weight back later on. For adults, surgery is an effective long-term treatment but it comes with several risks and complications.

=== Obesity prevention ===
Environmental factors play a large role in obesity rates. Studies have shown that people who live in the same socioeconomic contexts in Texas, regardless of race, tend to have similar rates of obesity. Generally speaking, encouraging healthy habits, raising awareness, and educating people about portion sizes and nutritious requirements can help prevent obesity. Childhood prevention is key - a child who was overweight at 12 years of age has a 75% chance of being overweight as an adult.

=== Obesity policy ===
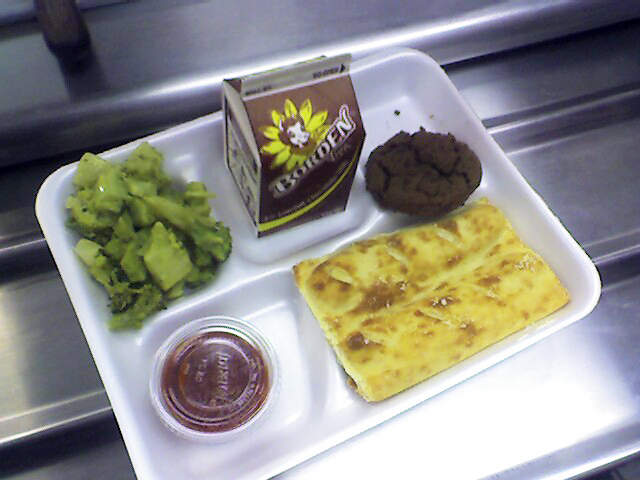
Public-school lunch

In 2003, the Texas School Nutrition Policy Launch set nutrition standards with the intentions of discouraging obesity. This policy lowered the availability of foods of minimal nutritional value in schools, limited portion sizes, limited trans fats, and limited fried foods. Texas has also required early childhood education programs to encourage breastfeeding, provide drinking water access, and provide daily physical activity. The state also has a fund specifically for financing healthy food. In 2013, the Obesity Prevention Program was created after merging the Nutrition, Physical Activity, and Obesity Prevention (NPAOP) and Worksite Wellness Programs. This program supports healthy eating, physical activity, and policies that promote healthier lifestyles. In 2021, during the 87th Texas Legislative Session, four House bills and two Senate bills were created in an attempt to improve obesity treatment, prevention, or both. None of these bills were passed during the 87th Texas Legislative Session leaving obesity policy and healthcare in Texas relatively unchanged from the previous session.

=== Alcohol use ===
The most commonly abused substance in Texas is alcohol. The rate of binge drinking in males in Texas is comparable to that of males in the United States. In 2017, 22.4% of adult males in Texas reported binge drinking, as compared to 22.1% of males in the United States. Less than 12% of females adults in Texas reported binge drinking. Alcohol abuse and alcoholism can lead to a variety of health issues including liver damage, heart problems, cancer, and depression. Further, 61% of high school students in Texas have tried alcohol and 17% of Texas high school students had their first drink before the age of 13. Based on 2016-2017 surveys, it was estimated that in Texas on average each year over a million individuals 12 years old or older had an alcohol use disorder in the last year.

==== Alcohol policy ====
The Texas Ignition Interlock Law went into effect during September 2015. This law requires judges to order ignition interlocks for all drunk-drivers with a Blood Alcohol Level of 0.15% or greater. Since the passing of this law, the drunk driving related death rate in Texas has decreased by 8.5%.

== Maternal and infant health ==
Texas has one of the highest maternal mortality rates in the United States and the developed world. According to the Texas Maternal Mortality and Morbidity Review Committee (MMMR), near 90% of the recorded maternal deaths in the state were preventable cases. Black women were reported to be disproportionately affected, maternal deaths of black women being nearly twice the rate of white women. This often due to underlying conditions like heart disease, mental health complications, along with inadequate postpartum care.

In 2023, Texas extended the postpartum Medicaid coverage from lasting for 60 days to 12 months, a massive economical effort to address the gaps in care and reduce maternal mortality.

Infant health disparities also persist in Texas. Black infants in the state are more than twice as likely to die before their first birthday as compared to white infants.

=== Rates of infant mortality ===
For decades the infant mortality rate in Texas was higher than the nationwide rate but that gap has slowly closed. In 2017, the infant mortality rate in Texas was identical to the nationwide rate: 5.9 deaths per 1,000 live births. This rate is not identical across the state of Texas and studies have found significant disparities between zip codes. For example, the 76164 zip code has an infant mortality rate of 12.3 deaths per 1,000 live births while the neighboring 76107 zip code has a rate of 1.8 deaths per 1,000 live births. Additionally, Black families in Texas are disproportionately burdened by these rates. In 2015, the infant mortality rate for Black babies in Texas was 10.9 deaths per 1,000 births. These disparities can be explained by factors such as socioeconomic status, air pollution, and access to health care.

==== Preterm birth ====
A birth is considered preterm when it takes place more than 3 weeks before the estimated due date. Preterm birth rates in Texas are consistently higher than the nationwide rate. In 2016, 10.4% of live births in Texas were preterm. The rate for Black mothers specifically was elevated - 13.6%. Numerous factors have been associated with premature birth, including lack of prenatal care, race, obesity, smoking, and even air pollution.

==== Low birth weight ====
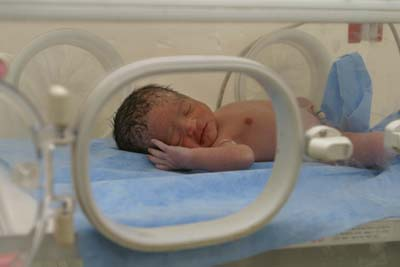
Preterm baby in incubator

A low birth weight is less than 2500 grams. The rate of low birth weight in Texas has always been higher than the nationwide rate. In 2016, 8.4% of live births in Texas had a low birth weight. The rate for Black mothers specifically was 13.5%. Babies of mothers who do not get prenatal care are 3 times more likely to have a low birth weight and 5 times more likely to die than those born to mothers who do get care. As for long-term complications, low birth weight babies are at a higher risk for cerebral palsy, blindness, deafness, and developmental delay.

==== Prenatal care ====
Prenatal care is the best way to prevent preterm births and low birth weight babies. Unfortunately, in 2016 only 65% of pregnant women in Texas had access to prenatal care in their first trimester. Women being unaware of their pregnancies, economic hardship due to inability to work during pregnancy, lack of knowledge or access to health services, and difficulty finding transportation are contributing factors to this alarmingly low rate. Texas has also seen significant disparities in who receives prenatal care - 75% of White women and only 55% of Black women received prenatal care during their first trimester. Although women covered by Medicaid are supposed to automatically transition into the Healthy Texas Women program for postpartum coverage, this transition does not always take place.

=== Abortion services ===
In 2017 the Guttmacher Institute reported that 96% of Texas counties had no clinics that provided abortions. Private insurance policies and the Affordable Care Act only cover abortion in cases of life endangerment or severely compromised physical health. Most women must receive counseling including information that is designed to discourage them from having an abortion, they must then wait 24 hours meaning they must make two trips to the facility which may entail missing two days of work, paying for the trip to the facility and the cost of an over night stay at the site of the abortion clinic. The working poor may not be able to cover the costs of abortion; the Guttmacher Institute called these requirements "unnecessary and burdensome." In May 2021, Texas passed an abortion bill that will ban abortion from as early as six weeks, before many women realize that they are pregnant. The ban includes women or girls who become pregnant by incest or rape. The bill came into effect in September 2021. On August 25, 2022, a full ban on abortion without exception for rape or incest went into effect in Texas. Healthcare providers who violate the law face life in prison and a $100,000 fine. This ban was an attack on abortion healthcare and made it impossible to receive an abortion in Texas unless it is to save the pregnant person's life or to prevent serious risk to the pregnant person's physical health. This ban has resulted in new socioeconomic barriers to healthcare for pregnant women seeking an abortion in Texas as not all pregnant women can afford to travel out of state for this vital healthcare. This further exacerbates the socioeconomic disparities already present in healthcare in Texas.

=== Vaccinations ===
In 2017, 67.8% of children aged 35 months in Texas completed the recommended vaccination schedule. The highest individual vaccine rate was for the polio virus: 93.1% of children age 35 months in Texas received this vaccine. The lowest individual vaccine rate was for hepatitis A: 62.6% of children age 35 months in Texas received this vaccine. Some children are under-vaccinated due to issues with accessing preventative care, vaccine delivery, or parental choice. The state has started to implement ImmTrac, a free vaccination record system. As of early 2023 vaccination rates are as follows: 77% of Texans have received one dose of the vaccine making them partially vaccinated, 64% of Texans have received two doses making them fully vaccinated, and roughly 24 have received three or more doses making them fully vaccinated and boosted.

==== Vaccination policy ====
In 2013, Texas passed legislation that requires employees of child-care facilities to have certain vaccinations, unless the employee objects for reasons of conscience. Texas has allowed for parents to exempt their children from vaccines by citing medical reasons since 1972. Further, Texas has allowed for parents to exempt their children from vaccines on the basis of religious belief since 2003. In October 2021 Governor Greg Abbott issued Executive Order GA-40 banning any entity in Texas from requiring a COVID-19 vaccine or compelling the receipt of a COVID-19 vaccine. The Governor dealt a heavy blow to healthcare in Texas with this mandate. The maximum fine for violating this executive order is $1,000 with no jail time.

== Mental health ==
Texas faces critical shortages in mental health services, specifically in rural areas. As of 2023, Texas was ranked within the bottom five of states in overall access to mental health care. More than 200 out of the 254 counties in Texas do not have a practicing psychiatrist. This has been seen to exasperating delays in treatment as well as increased reliance on emergency services and the criminal justice system.

Texas increased its mental health budget in 2022 and 2023 in order to address these challenges, and expanded inpatient psychiatric bed availability and funding for behavioral health services in schools. Critics argue that the additional funding remains insufficient, and that given the size of the population and the scale of unmet need, additional funding is in order.

=== Mental Health Policy ===
In 2016 the Select Committee on Mental Health during the 85th Texas Legislature identified problems with, “Access to services, early intervention, assessment and treatment for both children and adults, adequate bed capacity,... and workforce challenges”. Since 2016 little has been done to significantly improve these challenges, however, a recommendation made by the committee in 2016 was enacted into law in 2021 requiring a Mental health crisis hotline phone number be printed on the back of every student id issued by a public school, grades seven through college. This was a minor step forward to address mental health concerns in Texas, that endures, despite multiple setbacks to mental health policy in Texas. This can be seen In June 2021 when Senate Bill 1109 was vetoed by Texas Governor Greg Abbott. This bill would have required middle and high school students to receive instruction regarding the prevention of child abuse, family violence, and dating violence all of which contribute to poor mental health for their victims.

== Medicaid coverage and expansion ==
Texas, along with 9 other states, has not adopted Medicaid expansion under the Affordable Care Act. Texas also holds the record for the highest number and percentage of residents that are uninsured in the United States. As of 2023, approximately 770,000 adults in Texas fall into the Medicaid “coverage gap”. This means that these individuals earn too much to qualify for Medicaid and not enough to receive any subsidies on the Health Insurance Marketplace.

State leadership continues its consistent rejections of proposals to expand Medicaid, even in spite of broad public support along with financial incentives offered through federal legislation, like the American Rescue Plan Act. As a result, Texas declined billions in federal matching funds, ranking near the bottom in the nation in per capita Medicaid spending. These decisions continues to shape access to healthcare, possibly contributing to high rates of uninsurance and preventable health cases within the state.

=== Limited Access to Healthcare ===
Texas ranks 49th in mental health providers per 100,000 citizens and 47th in primary care providers per 100,000 citizens. Texas also has the highest percentage of uninsured population coming in last place. There are negative effects and increased risk when uninsured and uninsured adults are less likely to receive preventive services for chronic conditions such as diabetes, cancer, and cardiovascular disease. Similarly, children without health insurance who lack access to healthcare are less likely to receive critical preventative services, immunizations, and treatment for conditions such as asthma. On top of individual problems with healthcare in Texas there is a shortage of healthcare providers as a whole in the state. Of the 254 counties in Texas, 230 counties are experiencing a whole-county shortage of primary care physicians, 20 counties are experiencing a partial area-specific shortage of PCPs, and only 4 counties are experiencing no shortage of Primary Care Physicians. Healthcare can be difficult to access in Texas for a multitude of different reasons that are less common or do not exist in other states.

== Medical research ==
Texas has many research medical centers. The state has nine medical schools, three dental schools, and two optometry schools. Texas has two Biosafety Level 4 (BSL-4) laboratories: one at The University of Texas Medical Branch (UTMB) in Galveston, and the other at the Southwest Foundation for Biomedical Research in San Antonio—the first privately owned BSL-4 lab in the United States.

The Texas Medical Center in Houston, holds the world's largest concentration of research and healthcare institutions, with 47 member institutions. The Texas Medical Center performs the most heart transplants in the world. The University of Texas M. D. Anderson Cancer Center in Houston is an academic institution that centers around cancer patient care, research, education and prevention.

San Antonio's South Texas Medical Center facilities rank sixth in clinical medicine research impact in the United States. The University of Texas Health Science Center is another highly ranked research and educational institution in San Antonio.

Both the American Heart Association and the University of Texas Southwestern Medical Center call Dallas home. The Southwestern Medical Center ranks "among the top academic medical centers in the world". The institution's medical school employs the most medical school Nobel laureates in the world.

== Legislative responses ==
The Trust for America's Health ranked Texas 15th highest in adult obesity, with 27.2 percent of the state's population measured as obese. The 2008 Men's Health obesity survey ranked four Texas cities among the top 25 fattest cities in America; Houston ranked 6th, Dallas 7th, El Paso 8th, and Arlington 14th. Texas had only one city, Austin, ranked 21st, in the top 25 among the "fittest cities" in America. The same survey has evaluated the state's obesity initiatives favorably with a "B+". The state is ranked forty-second in the percentage of residents who engage in regular exercise.

Notwithstanding the concentration of elite medical centers in the state, The Commonwealth Fund ranks the Texas healthcare system the third worst in the nation. Texas ranks close to last in access to healthcare, quality of care, avoidable hospital spending, and equity among various groups. Causes of the state's poor rankings include politics, a high poverty rate, and the highest rate of illegal immigration in the nation. In May 2006, Texas initiated the program "code red" in response to the report the state had 25.1 percent of the population without health insurance, the largest proportion in the nation.

== Healthcare Providers in Texas ==
CMS is responsible for enforcing the Affordable Care Act (ACA) individual and group health insurance market reforms and Health Providers work via it, while the state (TDI) is responsible for reviewing rates for compliance with state and federal law
The table below shows the top Health Provider classifications by Specialty and ACA Plan Participation, with primary practice addresses in Texas. There are 9,573 pharmacies (6,511 accept ACA plans) staffed by 20,470 pharmacists in Texas (update: Mon, 09 Jun 2025 19:34 GMT), according to the NPPES via summary report by Pharmacy Near Me pharmacy locator.

Data compiled from public datasets. "Accept ACA Plans" indicates providers accepting ACA health plans based on machine-readable insurer data.
| Provider classification | Providers | Accept ACA Plans | ACA coverage (%) |
|---|---|---|---|
| Acupuncturist | 1452 | 384 | 26.45 |
| Allergy & Immunology | 825 | 477 | 57.82 |
| Anesthesiology | 8662 | 5226 | 60.33 |
| Audiologist | 1862 | 834 | 44.79 |
| Behavior Analyst | 6694 | 4260 | 63.64 |
| Chiropractor | 12370 | 3379 | 27.32 |
| Dentist | 32647 | 19119 | 58.56 |
| Dermatology | 2245 | 1407 | 62.67 |
| Emergency Medicine | 9203 | 5965 | 64.82 |
| Family Medicine | 20134 | 11480 | 57.02 |
| Internal Medicine | 30938 | 20056 | 64.83 |
| Nurse Practitioner | 45082 | 28109 | 62.35 |
| Obstetrics & Gynecology | 6706 | 4337 | 64.67 |
| Ophthalmology | 2699 | 1784 | 66.10 |
| Optometrist | 9111 | 6457 | 70.87 |
| Orthopaedic Surgery | 4332 | 2408 | 55.59 |
| Pediatrics | 12157 | 8205 | 67.49 |
| Physician Assistant | 17019 | 9713 | 57.07 |
| Podiatrist | 2575 | 1377 | 53.48 |
| Primary Care Physician (PCP) | 48345 | 29453 | 60.92 |
| Psychologist | 8610 | 3085 | 35.83 |
| Registered Nurse | 17403 | 3339 | 19.19 |
| Social Worker | 16950 | 6820 | 40.24 |
| Surgery | 6100 | 3647 | 59.79 |
| Urology | 1458 | 915 | 62.76 |

== Texas Department of State Health Services ==
The Texas Department of State Health Services manages state government projects in Texas.

The health insurance marketplace for Texas is HealthCare.gov, which is also the federal marketplace usable by anyone.

== Hospitals in Texas ==
Texas has hospitals serving every part of the state.

== Healthcare by region ==
=== Dallas, Texas ===
Dallas, Texas offers healthcare services.

=== Galveston, Texas ===
Galveston, Texas offers healthcare services.

=== Houston, Texas ===
Houston, Texas offers healthcare services.

=== Lubbock, Texas ===
Lubbock, Texas offers healthcare services.

=== San Antonio, Texas ===
San Antonio, Texas offers healthcare services.
