= Black fatigue =

Term used in discussions of race-related stress in the United States

Black fatigue or Proper Negro fatigue is an American expression referring to Black people in the United States experiencing psychological and physical issues driven by factors like systemic racism. Coined by the blog This Is Your Conscience in 2012, the term was immediately appropriated by white nationalists and redefined as a sense of "fatigue" when engaging with Black individuals.

== Definition ==
In 2020, writer and expert in diversity, equity, and inclusion (DEI) Mary Frances Winters published Black Fatigue: How Racism Erodes the Mind, Body and Spirit, in which she introduced the term "black fatigue" and explained it in detail. Winters was interviewed by CNN on April 5, 2021, during which she discussed the causes of Black fatigue. She was also interviewed by NBC News, stating that she also experienced Black fatigue. Winters defined Black fatigue as a generational stressor that leaves Black people feeling physically, mentally, and spiritually exhausted. Reportedly, Black fatigue stems from the lack of being heard by White people and the absence of racial progress in the United States. Black fatigue is caused by racism and can result in various mental health conditions, such as post-traumatic stress disorder, depression, and anxiety.

In essence, Winters defined the term as the chronic exhaustion experienced by African Americans due to systemic racism in the United States. Specifically, she described it as "the multifaceted physical and psychological damage wrought by simply living, day by day, in a racist society". Winters said Black fatigue is reportedly a complex issue that is not easy to fix. To "eliminate" Black fatigue, she recommended acknowledging the emotional toil of racism on Black people and exercising caution in interactions by focusing on avoiding microaggression. She described Black fatigue as a "broad" issue and suggested that changing the U.S. system is necessary to fix it. An expert from MetroHealth Medical Center defined Black fatigue as the psychological toll Black people endure in the US as a result of witnessing the killing of their community members by police.

== Other uses ==
Some communities have co-opted and informally redefined the term "Black fatigue". According to a column in the Milwaukee Journal Sentinel, this revision was primarily carried out by followers of the MAGA movement. The co-option began in April 2025 following the murder of Austin Metcalf, a White high school student, by Karmelo Anthony, a student from a nearby school district. Metcalf's fatal stabbing sparked heated reactions on social media, with the alt-right starting to use the new definition of the term. The term started being used on platforms like Instagram, Twitter, and TikTok and was often seen in posts' comments section. According to Her Campus, the use of the redefined form of "Black fatigue" was growing on social media platforms as of October 2025, and its original meaning has largely been lost.

This new interpretation of the term describes White people feeling "fatigue" during interactions with Black people. It became widely recognized after a viral TikTok video in which a female influencer criticized Black people's behavior. The TikToker in the video said, "Black fatigue is real," expressing that she is "fed-up" with what she describes as Black people's "ghetto ratchet behavior" and "victimhood." The video sparked controversy in the comments, with some supporting her and others criticizing her. Some commenters claimed she misused the term. The woman later deleted the video due to backlash. Rachel Stovall, writing for Colorado Springs's The Gazette, said there was a "surge" of internet users in 2025 complaining about Black people in comments sections of videos and accompanying their comments with the term "Black fatigue". She said such comments can typically be seen in videos of Black people engaging in violent and antisocial behavior.

== Reactions and analysis ==
In an interview with Rolling Stone, Winters said she was "devastated" when she discovered right-wing groups co-opted the term; she said it will not stop her from campaigning for African Americans, and she will not let it affect her personally or emotionally. Zari Taylor, internet culture expert of New York University, said the co-option of Black fatigue was part of a tactic used by right-leaning figures that starts by ridiculing social justice phrases or definitions and eventually co-opts them to mean something completely different. Stacey Patton of NewsOne said White people had stolen Black fatigue; she called them "criminals and failures". She also called the use of the phrase on social media "ideological warfare" and "racist rot". Nathan Abraha, writing for ByBlacks.com, called for Black people to "protect" the meaning of Black fatigue, calling the term a "lived reality" and more than a "buzzword".

Reportedly, some popular Black podcasters and influencers have also changed the meaning of Black fatigue, saying they are tired of hearing discussions about social injustice rather than experiencing it. Black Westchester said they did it to make their White viewers be "more comfortable". The San Antonio Observer said Black fatigue was "coined by Black folks, for Black folks" and described the co-opting of the term as "flipping the script". Yellowhammer News podcast hosted by Dale Jackson said the people who co-opted Black fatigue are not tired of Black people in general but only of their bad behavior. Up and Coming Weekly newspaper said the definition of Black fatigue had "evolved" and now means emotional exhaustion of Black and White conservatives due to facing accusations of racism for expressing their opinions and the rise of crimes in Black communities like drug use, youth violence and looting of stores.

== See also ==
- Racial battle fatigue
- Microaggression
- Systemic racism
- Racial trauma
- Psychological impact of discrimination on health
- Race-based traumatic stress
