= Zaher =

Zaher (Arabic: زاهر) is a given name and surname of Arabic origin. Notable people with the surname include:

== Given name ==
- Zaher el-Khatib (1940–2025), Lebanese politician

== Surname ==
- Ahmed Zaher (born 1989), Egyptian trap shooter
- Hamed Shami Zaher (born 1984), Qatari footballer
- Hamid Zaher (born 1974), Canadian-based Afghan writer and gay rights activist
- Ibrahim Zaher (born 1982), Egyptian water polo player
- Islam Zaher (born 1972), Egyptian artist
- Julia Zaher, Israeli Arab businessperson, philanthropist, and schoolteacher
- Mike Zaher (born 1985), American footballer
