= Passing (sociology) =

Ability to be regarded as having an identity one does not

Passing is the ability of a person to be regarded as a member of an identity group or category, such as racial identity, ethnicity, caste, social class, sexual orientation, gender, religion, age or disability status, that is often different from their own. Passing may be used to increase social acceptance to cope with stigma by removing stigma from the presented self and could result in other social benefits as well. Thus, passing may serve as a form of self-preservation or self-protection if expressing one's true or prior identity may be dangerous.

Passing may require acceptance into a community and may lead to temporary or permanent leave from another community to which an individual previously belonged. Thus, passing can result in separation from one's original self, family, friends, or previous living experiences. Successful passing may contribute to economic security, safety, and stigma avoidance, but it may take an emotional toll as a result of denial of one's previous identity and may lead to depression or self-loathing. When an individual deliberately attempts to "pass" as a member of an identity group, they may actively engage in performance of behaviors that they believe to be associated with membership of that group. Passing practices may also include information management of the passer in attempting to control or conceal any stigmatizing information that may reveal disparity from their presumed identity.

Etymologically, the term is simply the nominalisation of the verb pass in its phrasal use with for or as, as in a counterfeit passing for the genuine article or an impostor passing as another person. It has been in popular use since at least the late 1920s.

== Academic framework ==
Passing, as a sociological concept, was first coined by Erving Goffman as a term for one response to possessing some kind of stigma that is often less visible. Stigma, according to Goffman's framework in his work Stigma: Notes on the Management of Spoiled Identity (1963), "refer[s] to an attribute that is deeply discrediting" or "an undesired differentness from what [was] anticipated". According to Goffman, "This discrepancy, when known about or apparent, spoils his social identity; it has the effect of cutting him off from society and from himself so that he stands a discredited person facing an unaccepting world".

Thus, inhabiting an identity associated with stigma may be particularly dangerous and harmful. According to Link and Phelan, Roschelle and Kaufman, and Marvasti, it may lead to loss of opportunities due to status loss and discrimination, alienation and marginalization, harassment and embarrassment, and social rejection. These can be a persistent source of psychological issues.

To resist, manage, and avoid stigma and its associated consequences, individuals might choose to pass as a non-stigmatized identity. According to Nathan Shippee, "Passing communicates a seemingly "normal" self, one that does not apparently possess the stigma." According to Patrick Kermit, "To be suspected of being "not quite human" is the essence of stigmatisation, and passing is a desperate means to the end of appearing fully human in the sense of being like most other people."

When making the decision of whether to pass or not, there are many factors stigmatized actors may consider. Firstly, there is the notion of visibility. How visible their stigma is may problematize how much ease or difficulty they may face in attempting to pass. However, how visible their stigma is may also determine the intensity and frequency of adversity they may face from others as a result of their stigma. Goffman explains, "Traditionally, the question of passing has raised the issue of the "visibility" of a particular stigma, that is, how well or how badly-the stigma is adapted to provide means of communicating that the individual possesses it." Other scholars further emphasize the cruciality of visibility and conclude that "whether a stigma is evident to the audience can mark the difference between being discredited or merely discreditable".

Other factors may include risk, context, and intimacy. Different contexts and situations may make passing more easy or difficult and/or more safe or risky. How well others know the passer may impede their abilities as well. One scholar explains, "Individuals may pass in some situations but not others, effectively creating different arenas of life (depending on whether the stigma is known or not). Goffman claimed that actors develop theories about which situations are risky for disclosure, but risk is only one factor: intimacy with the audience can lead actors to disclose, or to feel guilty for not doing so." In addition to guilt, since passing can sometimes involve the fabrication of a false personal history to aid in concealment of their stigma, passing can complicate personal relationships and cause feelings of shame at having to be dishonest about their identity. According to Goffman, "It can be assumed that the possession of a discreditable secret failing takes on a deeper meaning when the persons to whom the individual has not yet revealed himself are not strangers to him but friends. Discovery prejudices not only the current social situation, but established relationships as well; not only the current image others present have of him, but also the one they will have in the future; not only appearances, but also reputation." Relating to this experience of passing, actors may have an ambivalent attachment to their stigma that can cause them to fluctuate between acceptance and rejection of their stigmatized identity. Thus, there may be times when the stigmatized individual will feel more inclined to pass and others when they feel less inclined.

Despite the potentially-distressing and dangerous parts of passing, some passers have expressed a habituation with it. In one study, Shippee accounts that "participants often portrayed it as a normal or mundane event." For those whose stigma invites particularly hostile responses from most of society, passing may become a regular part of everyday life that is necessary to survive in that society.

Regardless, the stigma that passers are subject to is not inherent. As Goffman explains, stigma exists not within the person but between an attribute and an audience. As a result, stigma is socially constructed and differs based on the cultural beliefs, social structures, and situational dynamics of various contexts. Thus, passing is also immersed in different contexts of the socially-structured meaning and behavior of daily life and passing implies familiarity with that knowledge.

Passing has been interpreted in sociology and cultural studies through different analytical lenses such as that of information management by Goffman and that of as cultural performance by Bryant Keith Alexander.

=== As information management ===
Goffman defines passing as 'the management of undisclosed discrediting information about self." Similarly, other scholars add that "Passing is mostly associated with strategies of information management that the discreditable use to pass for normal [in everyday life]". Whereas some individuals' stigma is immediately apparent, passers deal with different problems in that their stigma is not always so obvious. Goffman elaborates "The issue is not that of managing tension generated during social contacts, but rather that of managing information about his failing. To display or not to display; to tell or not to tell; to let on or not to let on; to lie or not to lie; and in each case, to whom, how, when, and where."

In Goffman's understanding, individuals possess various symbols that convey social information about us. There are prestige symbols that convey creditable information and there are stigma symbols that convey discrediting information. By managing the visibility and apparentness of their stigma symbols, passers prevent others from learning of their discredited and stigmatized status and remain discreditable. Passing may also include the adoption of certain prestige symbols and personal history or biography of social information that aids to conceal and draw attention away from their actual stigmatized status.

Goffman also briefly notes, "The concealment of creditable facts-reverse passing-of course occurs." Reverse passing, related to terms like "blackfishing", has emerged as a topic of discourse as critics raise concerns over cultural appropriation and accuse nonstigmatized individuals, such as prominent celebrities Kim Kardashian and Ariana Grande, of concealing creditable information about themselves for some social benefit. Notions of cultural appropriation, racial fetishization, and reverse passing entered public debate particularly in 2015, after a former college instructor and president of the Spokane, Washington, NAACP, Rachel Dolezal, was discovered to be white with no black racial heritage after she had presented herself as black for several years. As many point out, reverse passing crucially differs from passing in that individuals who reverse pass are not stigmatized and therefore are not subject to the harms of stigma that may force stigmatized individuals to pass.

=== As cultural performance ===
Bryant Keith Alexander, a professor of Communication, Performance and Cultural Studies at Loyola Marymount University, defines cultural performance as "a process of delineation using performative practices to mark membership and association." Using this definition, passing is reframed as a method to maintain cultural performance and choose both consciously and unconsciously to participate in other performances. Rather than through the management of symbols and the social information they convey, passers assume "the necessary and performative strategies that signal membership." Alexander reiterates, "Cultural membership is thus maintained primarily through recognizable performative practices." Hence, to successfully pass is to have your cultural performance assessed and validated by others.

With that interpretation, avoiding stigma by passing necessitates intimate understanding and awareness of social constructions of meaning and expected behaviors that signal membership. Shippee explains that "far from merely appraising situations to determine when concealment is required, passing encompasses active interpretations of several aspects of social life. It requires an understanding of cultural conventions, namely: what is considered "normal" and what is required to maintain it; customs of everyday interaction; and the symbolic character of the stigma itself.... Passing, then, embodies a creative mobilization of situational and cultural awareness, structural considerations, self-appraisals, and sense-making". Alexander recognizes that and then asserts that "passing is a product (an assessed state), a process (an active engagement), performative (ritualized repetition of communicative acts), and a reflection of one's positionality (politicized location), knowing that its existential accomplishment always resides in liminality."

== Ethnicity and race ==
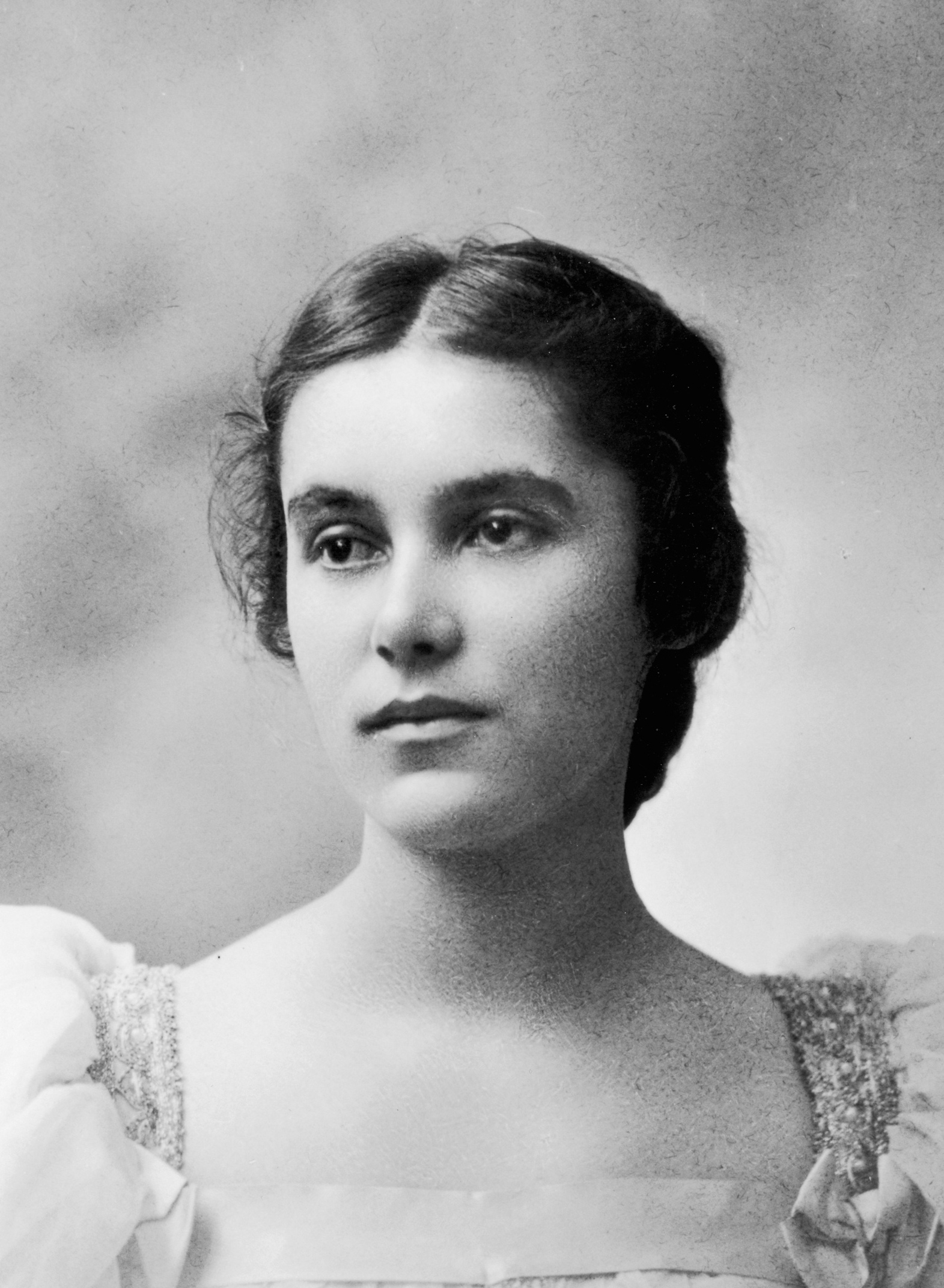
Anita Florence Hemmings, the first African-American woman to graduate from Vassar College, passed as white for socioeconomic reasons.

Historically and genealogically, the term passing has referred to mixed-race, or biracial Americans identifying as or being perceived as belonging to a different racial group. In Passing and the Fictions of Identity, Elaine Ginsberg cites an ad for escaped slave Edmund Kenney as an example of racial passing; Edmund Kenney, a biracial person, was able to pass as white in the United States in the 1800s. In the entry "Passing" for the GLBTQ Encyclopedia Project, Tina Gianoulis states that "for light-skinned African Americans during the times of slavery and the intense periods of racial resegregation that followed, passing for white was a survival tool that allowed them to gain education and employment that would have been denied them had they been recognized as "colored" people." The term passing has since been expanded to include other ethnicities and identity categories. Discriminated groups in North America and Europe may modify their accents, word choices, manner of dress, grooming habits, and even names in an attempt to appear to be members of a majority group or of a privileged minority group.

Nella Larsen's 1929 novella, Passing, helped to establish the term after several years of prior use. The writer and subject of the novella is a mixed African-American/Caucasian who passes for white. The novella was written during the Harlem Renaissance, when passing was commonly found in both reality and fiction. Since the 1960s Civil Rights Movement, racial pride has decreased the weight that is given to passing as an important issue for black Americans. Still, it is possible and common for biracial people to pass based on appearance or by hiding or omitting their backgrounds.

In "Adjusting the Borders: Bisexual Passing and Queer Theory," Lingel discusses bell hooks' notion of racial passing in conjunction with discussion of bisexual engagement in passing.

Romani people have a history of passing as well, particularly in the United States and often tell outsiders that they belong to other ethnicities such as Latino, Greek, Middle Eastern, or Native American.

== Social class and caste ==
Class passing, similar to racial and gender passing, is the concealment or misrepresentation of one's social class. In Class-Passing: Social Mobility in Film and Popular Culture, Gwendolyn Audrey Foster suggests that racial and gender passing is often stigmatized but that class passing is generally accepted as normative behavior. Class passing is common in the United States and is linked to the notions of the American Dream and of upward class mobility.

=== Popular culture ===
English-language novels that feature class passing include The Talented Mr. Ripley, Anne of Green Gables, and Horatio Alger novels. Films featuring class-passing characters include Catch Me If You Can, My Fair Lady, Pinky, ATL, and Andy Hardy Meets Debutante. Class passing also figures into reality television programs such as Joe Millionaire in which contestants are often immersed in displays of great material wealth or may have to conceal their class status.

== Sexuality and gender ==
The perception of an individual's sexual orientation is often based on their visual identity. The term visual identity refers to the expression of personal, social, and cultural identities through dress and appearance. In Visible Lesbians and Invisible Bisexuals: Appearance and Visual Identities Among Bisexual Women it is proposed that through the expression of a visual identity, others "read" a person's appearance and make assumptions about their wider identity. Therefore, visual identity is a prominent tool of non-verbal communication. The concept of passing is showcased in research by Jennifer Taub in her Bisexual Women and Beauty Norms. Some participants in the study stated that they attempted to dress as what they perceived as heterosexual when they partnered with a man, and others stated that they tried to dress more like a "lesbian." That exemplifies how visual identities can greatly alter people's immediate assumptions of sexuality. Therefore, presenting oneself as "heterosexual" is effectively "passing."

Passing by sexual orientation occurs when an individual's perceived sexual orientation or sexuality differs from the sexuality or sexual orientation with which they identify. In the entry "Passing" for the GLBTQ Encyclopedia Project, Tina Gianoulis notes "the presumption of heterosexuality in most modern cultures", which in some parts of the world, such as the United States, may be effectively compulsory, "most gay men and lesbians in fact spend a great deal of their lives passing as straight even when they do not do so intentionally." The phrase "in the closet" may be used to describe individual who hide or conceal their sexual orientation. In Passing: Identity and Interpretation in Sexuality, Race, and Religion, Maria Sanchez and Linda Schlossberg state that "the dominant social order often implores gay people to stay in the closet (to pass)." Individuals may choose to remain "in the closet" or to pass as heterosexual for a variety of reasons, including a desire to maintain positive relationships with family and policies or requirements associated with employment such as "Don't ask, don't tell", a policy that required passing as heterosexual within the military or armed forces.

Bisexual erasure causes some bisexual individuals to feel the need to engage in passing within presumed predominantly-heterosexual circles and even within LGBTQ circles for fear of stigma. In Adjusting the Borders: Bisexual Passing and Queer Theory, Jessica Lingel notes, "The ramifications of being denied a public sphere in which to practice a sexual identity that isn't labeled licentious or opportunistic leads some women to resort to manufacturing profiles of gayness or straightness to pledge membership within a community."

Gender passing refers to individuals who are perceived as belonging to a gender identity group that differs from the gender with which they were assigned at birth. In Passing and the Fictions of Identity, Elaine Ginsberg provides the story of Brandon Teena, who was assigned female at birth but lived as a man, as an example of gender passing in the United States. In 1993, Brandon moved to Falls City, Nebraska, where he initially passed as a man. However, community members discovered that Brandon had been assigned female at birth, and two men in it shot and murdered him. Ginsberg cites for another example of gender passing Billy Tipton, a jazz musician who was also assigned female at birth but lived and performed as a man until his death in 1989.

Within the transgender community, passing refers to the perception or recognition of trans individuals as belonging to the gender identity to which they are transitioning rather than the sex or gender they were assigned at birth.

== Religion ==
Passing as a member of a different religion or as not religious at all is not uncommon among minority religious communities. In the entry "Passing" for the GLBTQ Encyclopedia Project, Tina Gianoulis states "at times of rabid anti-Semitism in Europe and the Americas, many Jewish families also either converted to Christianity or passed as Christian" for the sake of survival. Circumcised Jewish males in Germany during World War II attempted to restore their foreskins as part of passing as Gentile. The film Europa, Europa explores that theme.

Shia Islam has the doctrine of taqiyya in which one is lawfully allowed to disavow Islam and profess another faith but secretly remain a Muslim if one's life is at risk. The concept has also been practised by various minority faiths in the Middle East such as the Alawites and Druze.

== Ability or disability ==
Disability passing may refer to the intentional concealment of impairment to avoid the stigma of disability, but it may also describe the exaggeration of an ailment or impairment to receive some benefit, which may take the form of attention or care. In Disability and Passing: Blurring the Lines of Identity, Jeffrey Brune and Daniel Wilson define passing by ability or disability as "the ways that others impose, intentionally or not, a specific disability or non-disability identity on a person." Similarly, in "Compulsory Able-Bodiedness and Queer/Disabled Existence," Robert McRuer argues that "the system of compulsory able-bodiedness...produces disability."

=== Passing as disabled ===
People with disabilities may exaggerate their disabilities when they are evaluated for medical care or accommodations often for fear of being denied support. "There are too many agencies out there with the ostensible purpose of helping us that still believe that as long as we technically can do something, like crab-walking our way into a subway station, we should have to do it," writes Gabe Moses, a wheelchair user who has a limited ability to walk. Those pressures may result in disabled people exaggerating symptoms or tiring out their body before an evaluation so that they are seen on a "bad day," instead of a "good day."

In sports, some mobility impaired individuals have been observed strategically exaggerating the extent of their disability to pass as more disabled than they are and be placed in divisions in which they may be more competitive. In quadriplegic rugby, or wheelchair rugby, some players are described as having "incomplete" quadriplegia in which they may retain some sensation and function in their lower limbs that may allow them to stand and walk in limited capacities. Based on a rule from the United States Quad Rugby Association (USQRA) that states that players need only a combination of upper- and lower-extremity impairment that precludes them from playing able-bodied sports, the incomplete quads may play alongside other quadriplegics who have no sensation or function in their lower limbs. That is justified by classifications the USQRA has developed in which certified physical therapists compare arm and muscle flexibility, trunk and torso movement, and ease of chair operation between players and rank them by injury level.

However, inconsistencies between medical diagnoses of injury and those classifications allows players to perform higher levels of impairment for the classifiers and pass for being more disabled than they are. As a result, their ranking may underestimate their capacity and they may attain a competitive advantage over teams with players whose capacity is not equivalent. That policy has raised questions from some about the ethics and fairness of comparing disabilities, as well as about how competition, inclusion, and ability should be defined in the world of sports.

=== Passing as non-disabled ===
Individuals with invisible disabilities such as people with mental illness; intellectual or cognitive disabilities; or physical disabilities that are not immediately obvious to others such as IBS, Crohn's disease, or ulcerative colitis may choose whether or not to reveal their identity or to pass as "normal". Passing as non-disabled may protect against discrimination but may also result in lack of support or accusations of faking.

Autistic people may employ strategies known as "masking" or "camouflaging" to appear non-autistic. That can involve behavior like suppressing or redirecting repetitive movements (stimming), maintaining eye contact despite discomfort, mirroring the body language and tone of others, or scripting conversations. Masking may be done to reduce the risk of ostracism or abuse. Autistic masking is often exhausting and linked to adverse mental health outcomes such as burnout, depression, and suicide. However, that perspective has been challenged in a 2023 review of autistic masking by Valentina Petrolini, Ekaine Rodríguez-Armendariz, and Agustín Vicente who question whether all autistic people see "being autistic" as a central aspect of their identity and whether all autistic people are capable of truly hiding their autistic status. Both conditions, they argue, would have to be fulfilled for the analogy to hold and conclude that only a subgroup of autistic people experiences masking as passing.

Individuals with visible physical impairments or disabilities, such as people with mobility impairment, including individuals who use wheelchairs or scooters, face greater challenges in concealing their disability.

In a study on individuals' experience with prosthetics, the ability of users to be able to pass as if they were "like everybody else" with their prosthetic based on the realistic or unrealistic appearance of the prosthetic was one factor in predicting whether patients would accept or reject prosthetic use. Cosmetic prosthetics that were, for example, skin-colored or had the added appearance of veins, hair, and nails were often harder to adapt to and use, but many individuals expressed a preference for them over more functional and more conspicuous prosthetics to maintain their personal conceptions of social and bodily identity.

One user of prosthetics characterized her device as one that could "maintain her humanness ('half way human'), which in turn prevented her, quite literally, from being seen to have an 'odd' body." Users also discussed wanting prosthetics that could help them maintain a walking gait, which would attract no stares and prosthetics that could be disguised or concealed under clothes in efforts to pass as non-disabled.

== Intersectional ==
Though passing may occur on the basis of a single subordinate identity such as race, often people's intersectional locations involve multiple marginalized identities. Intersectionality provides a framework for seeing the interconnected nature of oppressive systems and how multiple identities interact within them. Gay Asian men possess two key subordinated identities; in combination, they create unique challenges for them when passing. Sometimes, those men must pass as straight to avoid stigma, but around other gay men, they may attempt to pass as a non-racialized person or white to avoid the disinterest or fetishization often encountered upon revealing their Asian identities. By recognizing the hidden intersection of the gendered aspects of gay and Asian male stereotypes, these two distinct experiences make even more sense. Gay men are often stereotyped as effeminate and thereby insufficiently masculine as men. Stereotypes characterizing Asian men as too sexual (overly masculine) or too feminine (hypo-masculine) or even both also exhibit the gendered nature of racial stereotypes. Thus, passing as the dominant racial or sexuality category also often means passing as gender correct.

When Black transgender men transition in the workplace from identifying as female to passing as cisgender men, gendered racial stereotypes characterizing Black men as overly masculine and violent may affect how previously acceptable behaviors will be interpreted. One such Black trans man discovered that he had gone from "being an obnoxious Black woman to a scary Black man" and therefore had to adapt his behavior to gendered scripts to pass.

== See also ==
- Beard (companion)
- Closeted
- Closet Jew
- Dramaturgy (sociology)
- Identity politics
- Masking (behavior)
- Minority stress
- Model minority
- "On the Internet, nobody knows you're a dog"
- Stigma management
- Uncanny valley
- Undercover
