= Masking (behavior) =

Social process

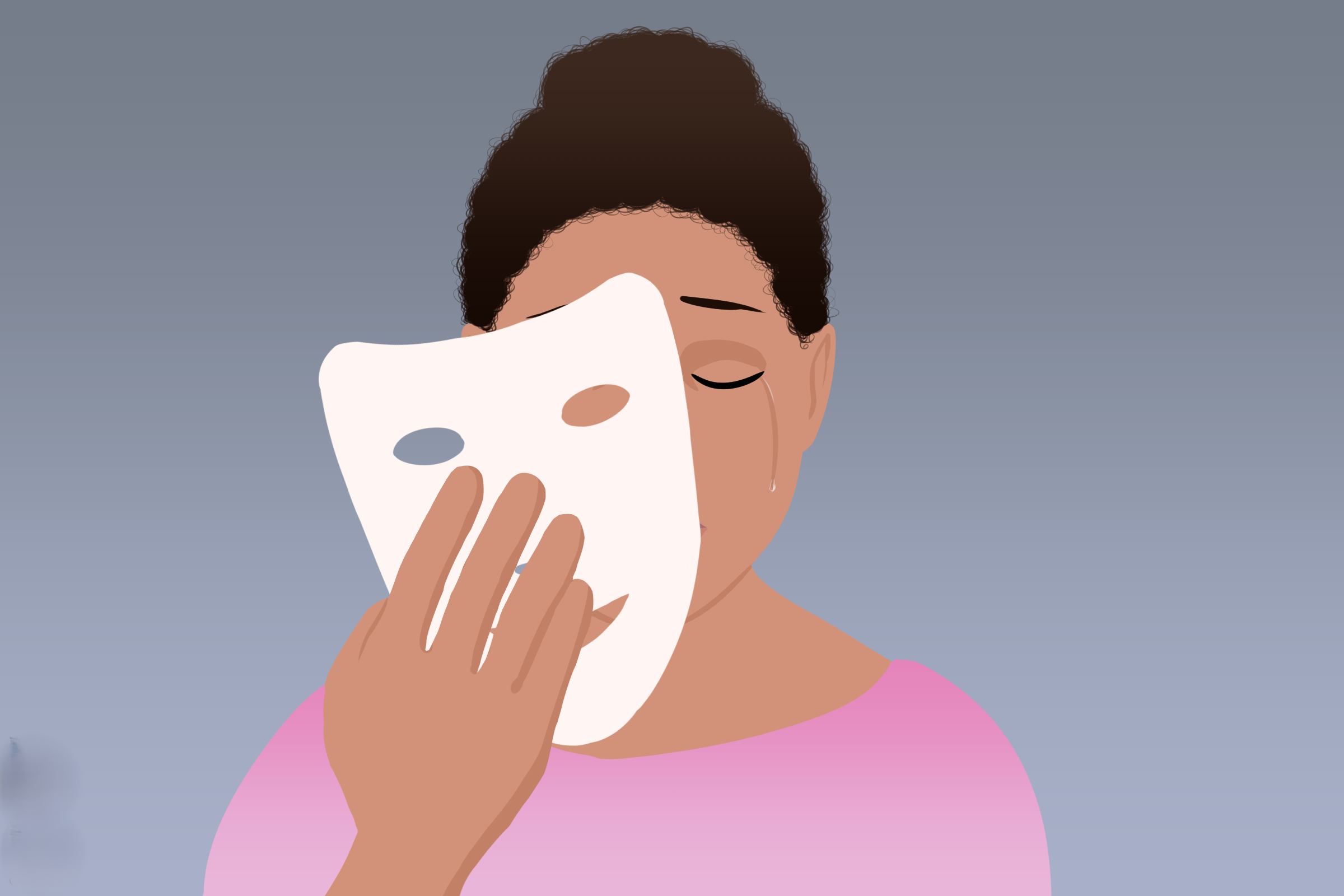
"Masking" is the act of concealing one's true personality, as if behind a metaphorical, physical mask.

In psychology and sociology, masking, also known as social camouflaging, is a defensive behavior in which an individual conceals their natural personality or behavior in response to social pressure, abuse, or harassment. Masking can be strongly influenced by environmental factors such as authoritarian parents, social rejection, and emotional, physical, or sexual abuse.

Masking is interconnected with maintaining performative behavior within social structures and cultures. Masking is mostly used to conceal a negative emotion (usually sadness, frustration, and anger) with a positive emotion or indifferent affect. Developmental studies have shown that this ability begins as early as preschool and becomes more developed with age.

The concept of masking is particularly developed in the understanding of autistic behaviour. For individuals with autism, masking behaviors are sometimes automatic. They may not even realize that they are doing them. This is not always the case though, as some behaviors take constant effort and conscious social monitoring to maintain.

Masks represent an artificial face, in the "saving face" sense. Seeing life as theatre is the core of the closely related social perspectives of dramatism, dramaturgy and performativity. Masks are a tool of impression management and stigma management, which are parts of reputation management.

== History ==
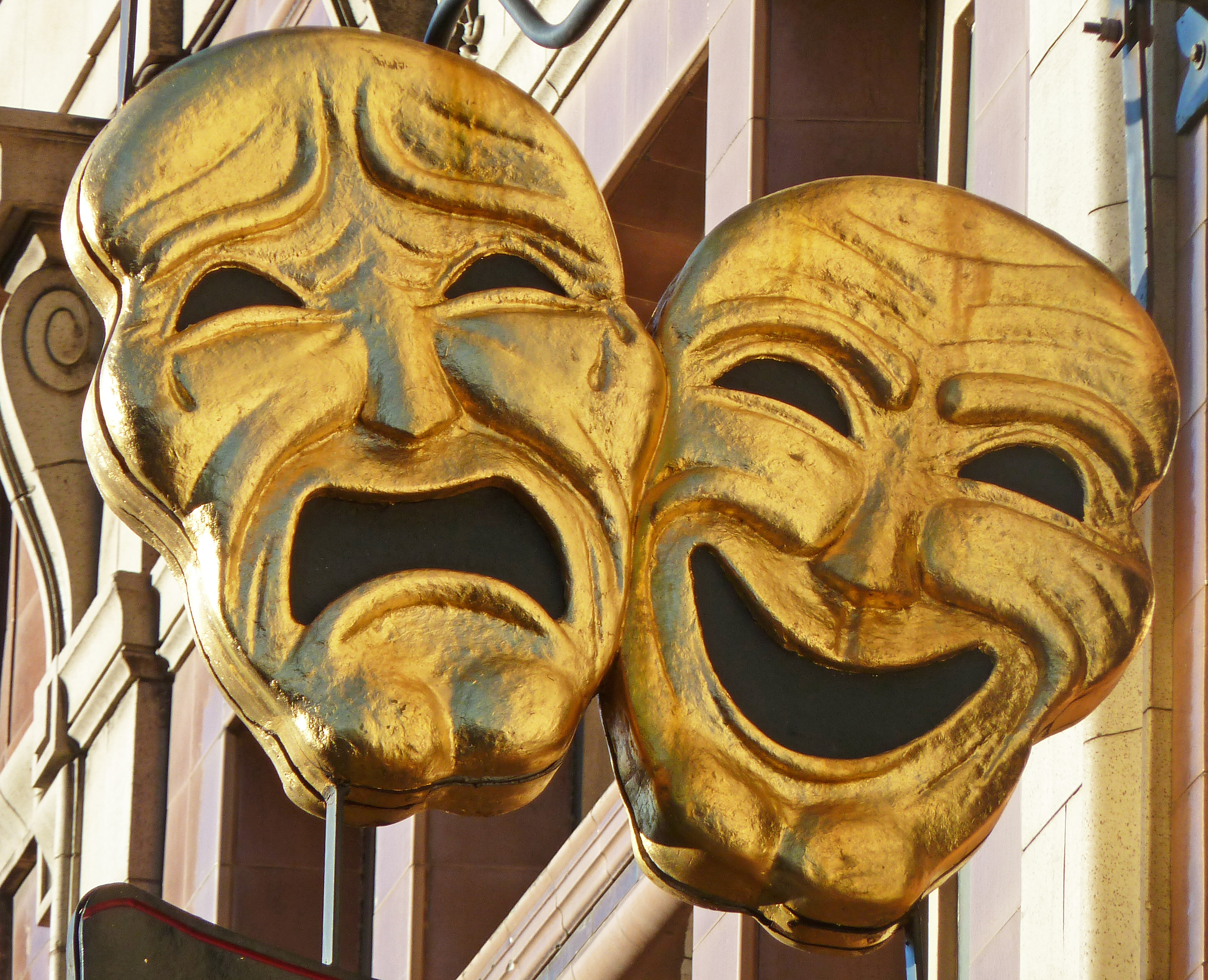
Tragedy and comedy masks are sometimes used by actors to convey emotions to achieve entertainment ends, similar to how people wear "masks" to convey emotions to achieve social ends.

Masking has existed since antiquity, with authors like Shakespeare referencing it in fiction long before masking was formally defined and studied within psychology.

In the influential book The Presentation of Self in Everyday Life (1956), Erving Goffman emphasized the link between social life and performance. Reviews of camouflaging literature suggest that Goffman's theory of social performance is still key for explaining how masking helps people shape others' perceptions and handle stigma.

Frantz Fanon is credited with defining masking in his 1957 Black Skin, White Masks, which describes masking behavior in race relations within the stratified post-war United States. Fanon explained how African-Americans, especially those of low social capital, adopted certain behaviors to resemble white people as well as other behaviors intended to please whites and reinforce the white man's higher social status.

The black man has two dimensions. One with his fellows, the other with the white man. That this self-division is a direct result of colonialist subjugation is beyond question.

— Frantz Fanon, Black Skins, White Masks,

The term masking was used to describe the act of concealing disgust by Paul Ekman (1972) and Wallace V Friesen (1969). They thought of it as a learned behavior.

Lorna Wing proposed that females' higher levels of masking than males led to their underdiagnosing of having autism in 1981.

The Camouflaging Autistic Traits Questionnaire (CAT-Q), which measures autistic masking, was published by Laura Hull, Simon Baron-Cohen and others in March 2019. Recent validity testing suggests that while the CAT-Q demonstrates measurement stability across age groups, further research is needed to investigate how cultural and age-related differences may impact its ability to properly measure populations in different countries.

== Causes ==
The social drivers of masking include social discrimination, cultural dominance, and violence. Elizabeth Radulski argues that masking is a cultural performance within Judith Butler's concept of performativity that helps individuals bypass cultural and structural barriers. For individuals with autism, masking is often the product of a fear-driven effort to follow perceived social norms and blend in with peers and colleagues in social or professional environments.

=== Situational contexts ===
The causes of masking are highly contextual and situational. Masking may disguise emotions considered socially inappropriate within a situational context, such as anger, jealousy, or rage. Individuals may mask in certain social situations, such as job interviews or dates, or around people of different cultures, identities, or ethnicities. For example, autistic individuals often engage in camouflaging within workplace settings as a necessary tool for job retention and promotion, as well as "fitting in" within the professional culture. Since different social situations require different performances, individuals often switch masks and exhibit different masking behaviors in different contexts. Code-switching, although associated more with linguistics, also refers to the process of changing one's masking behavior around different cultures in social and cultural anthropology. Contextual factors including relationships with one's conversation partner, social capital (class) differences, location, and social setting are all reasons why an individual would express, suppress, or mask an emotion.

== Consequences ==
In the workplace, masking leads to feelings of dissonance, insincerity, job dissatisfaction, emotional and physical exhaustion, and self-reported health problems. Some have also reported experiencing somatic symptoms and harmful physiological and cognitive effects as a consequence. It can lead to autistic burnout. Because masking behaviors can obscure a person's struggles or diagnostic indicators from colleagues, management, and school or medical professionals, it can also end up delaying accommodations or assistance that could be provided to them for support.

Masking can increase loneliness. In particular, some autistic individuals report that it impedes them forming real connections with other people, and many feel as if they have lost their true identity as an autistic individual, feeling as if they are only playing a role for the majority of their lives.

Though there are many disadvantages to masking for individuals, many report the benefits masking has brought for them. Such reports stated that individuals felt as though it became easier to socialize, to uphold careers, build relationships, and even at times, were able to protect themselves.

== Gender differences ==
There is a gendered disparity in masking behavior; studies show women mask negative emotions to a greater extent than men. According to psychologist Teresa Davis, this may be due to the greater social expectation for conformity placed on female gender roles, causing women to develop the skill to a greater extent than men during childhood socialization.

This causes autism in females to be underdiagnosed relative to males. In turn, females with unrecognised autism do not receive social allowances for this condition, increasing their motivation to mask. Additionally, reviews indicate that Patient Access Network (PAN) research mainly involves white, adult females without intellectual disabilities, pointing to the importance of including more demographically diverse participants to broaden findings.

== Cultural impacts ==
Research suggests that the prevalence of masking behaviors is not unique to individuals with autism but also exists in other underrepresented or marginalized groups (like immigrants, ethnic minorities, and LGBTQ people). Though these behaviors may vary, they are all utilized for similar reasons. Navigating sociocultural expectations and preventing rejection, discrimination, and exclusion are common reasons for social camouflaging in these contexts.

As briefly mentioned in the "Causes" section above, recent research compares autistic masking and cultural adaptation strategies such as code-switching or frame-switching used by immigrants or individuals of cultural minorities. In these cases, a person may alter their communication style, emotional expressions, or behavior to be in compliance with the majority culture's rules at the expense of their own culture. These modifications can be made unconsciously or consciously and are usually motivated by factors of safety or pressures of professional, academic or social acceptability.

It has been discovered by some research that the relationship between masking and mental health is not necessarily so straightforward. Certain collectivist (see Social organization) cultures were discovered to have worse mental health outcomes from minimal or high-level masking, making moderate levels more practical. This suggests that the process of masking (and its psychological impact) is not just an individual consideration but also based on overall cultural norms and public opinion. These findings emphasize the importance of realizing that social camouflaging is shaped by local values surrounding identity, difference, and belonging. Therefore, cultural practices and beliefs can directly impact the relationship between levels of masking and their psychological effects, rather than it being directly linear.

For those with autism, the ways people engage in masking behaviors can be different depending on cultural context. In collectivist cultures, social cohesion and conformity are more valued. These pressures may compel people with autism to suppress non-conformity behaviors even when they do not explicitly recognize such behaviors as being linked to their neurodivergence. In contrast, more individualist cultures of Western countries may foster varying reasons for camouflaging, such as one's desire to "fit in" with a group. Both circumstances may suppress identity, but differ slightly in the motivations and thought processes behind them. Social stigmatization of autism also varies across cultures and can strongly influence the amount of pressure on people to camouflage characteristics. In places where acceptance and understanding of autism are low, there can be more pressure to appear "normal" that creates more harmful or more intense masking.

== Autistic masking ==
Autistic masking is masking applied to autistic behaviors, with the aim of suppressing them (and appearing less autistic). It is a learned coping strategy.

Typical examples of autistic masking include the suppression of stimming and meltdowns, a common reaction to sensory overload. To compensate difficulties in social interaction with non-autistic peers, autistic people might maintain eye contact despite discomfort, use rehearsed conversational scripts, or mirror the body language and tone of others.

This masking often requires an exceptional effort. It is linked with adverse mental health outcomes such as stress, autistic burnout, anxiety and other psychological disorders, loss of identity, and suicidality. Some studies find that compensation strategies are seen as contributing to leading a successful and satisfactory life. However, experts caution that promoting camouflaging without addressing its psychological impacts could unintentionally cause negative mental health outcomes.

A 2021 study found masking experiences between autistic and non-autistic groups were similar, but only autistic people masked autism-specific symptoms. Masking has been linked to confusion about personal identity among these individuals, who can start to have trouble distinguishing their authentic qualities from the personas they have adopted to conform.

=== Late diagnosis ===
Masking is increasingly understood as a factor that can delay or prevent an autism diagnosis well into adulthood. Individuals diagnosed in adulthood have described the cumulative effects of years of unrecognised autism as including poor mental health outcomes, difficulty understanding the reasons for childhood peer rejection, emotional exhaustion, emotional dysregulation, and a loss of self-identity. Late-diagnosed women in particular have described their delayed diagnosis as having exposed them to an extended period of marginalisation, causing them to habitually mask from an early age.

The relationship between camouflaging and diagnostic delay has been examined directly. It has been proposed that camouflaging may delay identification in some autistic females until they encounter social pressures that exceed their capacity to cope—a threshold often reached in adolescence, when peer relationships become more complex. Autistic females receive an autism diagnosis, on average, later than autistic males, which may in part reflect a greater tendency among autistic women to adopt camouflaging strategies, making their autism less visible to clinicians. However, a 2024 study by Milner and colleagues found that while camouflaging and diagnostic age were related, the picture was more complex than a direct causal link, and that other factors also contribute to diagnostic delays.

Research identifies masking and compensatory strategies as among the key factors behind late diagnosis more broadly, alongside subtler symptom presentation and the misinterpretation of autistic traits as other psychiatric conditions. A formal diagnosis can increase a sense of community belonging, and its absence may delay the formation of a positive self-identity.

== See also ==
- Alter ego
- True self and false self
- Passing (sociology)
- Persona (psychology)
- Self-concealment
- Closeted
- Identity formation
- Undercover
- Facial Action Coding System
- Code-switching
- Honne and tatemae
- Minority stress
- Model minority
- John Henryism
- Beard (companion)
