= Autistic masking =

Suppression of autistic behaviors

Autistic masking is the act of concealing autistic traits to come across as neurotypical, as if behind a mask.

Autistic masking, also referred to as camouflaging, is the conscious or subconscious suppression of autistic behaviors with the goal of being perceived as neurotypical. Masking behavior is a learned coping strategy in response to minority stress that may prevent someone being stigmatized, but can also negatively impact their mental health.

Autistic people have cited social acceptance, the need to have a job, and the avoidance of ostracism or verbal or physical abuse as reasons for masking. However, research also shows autistic masking is frequently reported as physically, mentally, and emotionally exhausting for the individual, and the behavior is linked to long-term negative impacts on well-being.

== Terminology ==
There is no universally agreed-upon terminology for the concept. While some use the terms masking and camouflaging synonymously, others distinguish between masking (the suppression of behaviors) and compensation (of social difficulties) as the two main forms of camouflaging. Among autistic people, masking is the most commonly used umbrella term. Autistic researcher Wenn Lawson has proposed that adaptive morphing is a more fitting term.

The process of consciously reducing masking tendencies or not masking in some contexts, which some autistic people see as a desirable goal, is referred to as unmasking. Motivations for unmasking include no longer hiding one's true identity and avoiding adverse mental health outcomes.

== Presentations and reasons for masking ==
I camouflage by putting on a character… I treat my clothes rather like costumes, and certain items of clothing help me to uphold certain personality characteristics of which character I am on that occasion. I have a repertoire of roles for: cafe work, bar work, uni, various groups of friends, etc. They are all me at the core, but they are edited versions of me, designed to not stand out for the "wrong" reasons.

— (Female, 22),

Typical examples of heavier autistic masking include the suppression of stimming (in general or in public) and reactions to sensory overload. Autistic people may also mask by maintaining eye contact despite discomfort (e.g. anxiety, amygdala hyperarousal, sensory overload), mirroring/imitating facial expressions, body language and tone of others when unsure of appropriate social behavior, refraining from or restricting talking about passionate interests, or outwardly reacting less to sensory stresses. While masking can be done in private, it is often a response to social stress. A 2025 study found that autistic people masked significantly more around non-autistic people and significantly less when alone or with autistic peers.

Autistic people with conversational difficulties may use complex strategies to converse more successfully, such as scripting a conversation outline, developing conscious "rules" for conversations, and carefully monitoring if these are being followed. They may also feel the need to monitor and adjust their natural facial expressions or tone of voice to meet an expected social response (e.g. in order to avoid upsetting others or to outwardly convey their inner experience in a more "neurotypical" way). Many autistic people learn conversational rules and social behaviors by watching television shows and other media and by observing and mimicking a character's behavior.

A 2024 study supports prior research linking masking/camouflaging to interpersonal trauma and stigma, underlining its association with mental health challenges. From reduced self-esteem and authenticity issues in autistic adults, these findings challenge the common promotion of masking strategies for parenting, therapy, and education. Thus advocating for neurodiversity-affirming approaches that respect the autistic traits and identity, preventing trauma and eliminating any practices that shame autistic individuals.

== Consequences ==
Masking often requires an exceptional effort. It is linked with adverse mental health outcomes such as stress, anxiety, depression, and other psychological disorders, loss of identity, and suicidality. According to a recent meta-analysis, the association between masking and depression, general anxiety, and social anxiety appears consistent across different age groups (children, adolescents, and adults). Some studies find that compensation strategies are seen as contributing to leading a successful life. Since many studies on masking focus on autistic adolescents or adults without cognitive impairments, the generalizability of such findings across the autism spectrum is uncertain.

In a 2025 study, a link has been found between autistic individuals and the increased risk of bullying and harassment. This systemic review dives into the vulnerability of autistic individuals to social, verbal, and physical bullying which leads to adverse mental health disorders. Furthermore, masking is described as a "survival strategy" for people with autism, as it tends to decrease the exposure to bullying overall, yet increases psychosocial loads on the person. Thus, between studies, it is discovered that whether autistic individuals are masking or not, they face increased risk for mental health disorders. Masking may conceal the person's need for support. It can complicate a diagnosis of autism spectrum disorder (ASD), for example, underdiagnosis of females, particularly past childhood, as relevant symptoms are suppressed or compensated for. The diagnostic criteria for ASD in the DSM-5, published in 2013, explicitly state that while symptoms "must be present in the early developmental period", these "may be masked by learned strategies in later life", allowing for a diagnosis even if autistic behaviors and difficulties are successfully masked. Addition of such a formulation was proposed to the workgroup drafting the criteria by representatives of the Autistic Self Advocacy Network, including Ari Ne'eman and Steven Kapp. The diagnostic criteria for ASD in the ICD-11 (2022) contain a similar provision.

It has been hypothesized that masking may play an important role in explaining why autistic women are significantly less often recognized and diagnosed as autistic compared to men. This hypothesis was put forward by Lorna Wing as early as 1981 and is recognized in the DSM-5-TR published in 2022. Based on behavioral history, autistic women are more likely to receive alternative diagnoses such as anxiety, mood, learning, or eating disorders rather than autism. Research suggests that many autistic women may hide or mimic neurotypical behavior automatically rather than consciously choosing to do so, which can make them appear less visibly autistic and therefore less likely to be diagnosed. As a result, many autistic women remain undiagnosed until adulthood. A 2025 study, however, found no link between reported camouflaging behaviors and age of autism diagnosis for autistic women. Researchers proposed that gender stereotypes and inadequate assessment tools are more significant barriers to diagnosis for autistic women than camouflaging behaviors.

A serious consequence of prolonged masking/camouflaging is autistic burnout and suicidality, which spans from the need to conform to social expectations. Masking/camouflaging is both a conscious and unconscious process to reduce dissonance and distress, but over time, the emotional and cognitive strain can lead to alexithymia. Alexithymia is a condition that affects about 50% of autistic people, making it difficult to distinguish emotions from their physical states. Alexithymia can impair their ability to self-regulate, thus delaying their recognition of stress until it reaches a critical point, leading to burnout. Suppression of stimming compounds the stress further. In Hochschild's theory of emotional labor, masking/camouflaging involves cognitive, bodily, and expressive efforts to suppress emotions, which can lead to mental challenges. The unconscious aspects of masking are potentially linked to dissociation, which may serve to manage stress but increases the risk of long-term burnout and suicidality.

These consequences have led to modern research into autistic masking through computational neuroscience and machine learning. A 2025 study gathered data from 601 participants to assess whether machine learning is a viable system to predict autistic traits and symptoms of mental health decline by using camouflage behaviors. This study discovered that there is promising evidence that machine learning techniques can "predict autistic traits and symptoms of anxiety and depression based on camouflaging behaviors in a neurodiverse sample." Essentially, with the modern age of AI, research conclusions state that the connections might be valid between autism and camouflaging. The end goal that the authors present in Predicting autistic traits, anxiety and depression symptoms using camouflaging autistic traits questionnaire (CAT-Q-ES): A machine learning study, is that there might be a way to streamline diagnoses as well as mental health assistance for autistic individuals.

Much of the discourse surrounding autistic masking focuses on its negative consequences. However, some research suggests that masking may also contribute to a greater sense of social acceptance among autistic individuals. Repeatedly practicing masking strategies may also help some individuals become more successful in navigating social interactions.

== Discrimination ==
Autistic individuals face stigmatization and discrimination by the media, employers, along with the health and education system. This may encourage them to mask and engage in socially desirable behaviors to avoid being discriminated against. In media, the portrayals of autism has depicted autistic individuals as helpless and even violent. Robert F. Kennedy Jr., US Secretary of Health, referred to autism as a "chronic disease" and "epidemic"; this may further drive masking/camouflaging to avoid stigma. Autistic individuals may mask during recruiting or workplace environments to counter biases from employers' expectations of being neurotypical or stereotypes about autistic abilities. A 2023 study found that autistic or neurodivergent employees without a formal diagnosis may feel even less freedom to unmask than those with a formal diagnosis. This perceived freedom, however, is contingent on disclosing an autism diagnosis, which does not include all formally diagnosed adults. In education, autistic students may mask/camouflage to avoid social isolation from discriminatory practices like exclusion or refusal of activities neurotypical individuals participate in. Camouflaging in autistic individuals can be influenced by discrimination in various domains.

In many research studies, conclusions have been made to say that individuals who identify across multiple marginalized groups are more likely to face discrimination and tend to mask to avoid said treatment. Marginalized groups are defined as individuals who are excluded based on sex, race, social class, religious affiliation, and/ or appearance. A study took 462 individuals and found that those who identified as a sexual minority and were also diagnosed with autism subsequently reported higher levels of masking than those who were autistic but were in the sexual majority. As well as this, it is noted that those that identify with the sexual minority might find difficulties relating and connecting to the broader community of autistic people. Therefore, these studies have concluded that there is a further link of discrimination to be found between identifying as a sexual minority and having an autism diagnosis.

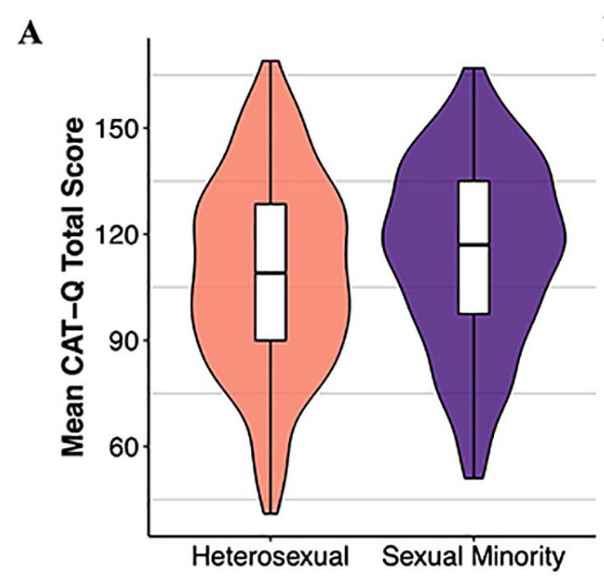
This image demonstrates the higher mean CAT-Q score of masking for autistic sexual minority groups compared to heterosexual autistic adults.

== Research ==
While masking was written about and discussed among autistic people, it has only become a focus of academic research since the 2010s. What research that exists primarily reports on autistic adults without co-occurring linguistic or intellectual disabilities. The Camouflaging Autistic Traits Questionnaire (CAT-Q), the first self-report measure for camouflaging, was published in 2018. Across 25 items, it measures the extent to which a person utilizes strategies to actively compensate for difficulties in social situations (Compensation, 9 items), uses strategies to hide autistic characteristics or portray a non-autistic persona (Masking, 8 items), and employs strategies to fit in with others in social situations (Assimilation, 8 items). Other researchers have criticized the use of self-report measures, arguing that self-report may exclude understudied groups within autism, such as individuals with linguistic disabilities.

In light of rising awareness of the adverse mental health outcomes of masking and insight into the double empathy problem, therapies and interventions with implicit or explicit targets of instilling neurotypical social behavior and suppressing autistic traits that can be adaptive in autistic people are controversial and often criticized by some researchers, neurodiversity proponents, and autistic self-advocates from the autism rights movement. Qualitative and quantitative studies have shown that a substantial proportion of autistic people who experienced applied behavior analysis therapy as children report being forced to behave like neurotypical peers or being encouraged to mask autistic features or behave "normally", with detrimental effects on their mental and overall well-being. In response to these concerns and accounts regarding risks of harm, some forms of ABA interventions have been reforming to mitigate risks of encouraging masking. Additionally, some researchers and practitioners have called for reforms in some other forms of interventions, such as social skills training, speech-language therapy, and occupational therapy, to mitigate such risks, with some therapists implementing such reforms.

There are some research studies centered around the experiences of masking by comparing different groups of neurotypes. In 2021, researchers conducted an online survey comparing masking experiences between autistic, non-autistic neurodivergent, and neurotypical groups. They found that the behavior of masking is shared across all types of people, but some aspects of masking are more specific to autism, such as sensory suppression and suppression of stimming. Researchers also recreated this study in a workplace context and examined workplace masking experiences for autistic, non-autistic, and neurotypical adults in the UK. They reported a large overlap amongst the three groups. Both neurodivergent and neurotypical people adopted masking strategies to achieve social goals, indicating that masking is a common experience, rather than one exclusive to autistic individuals.

There has also been qualitative research focused on the autistic experiences of masking. A study in 2022 conducted semi-structured interviews with twenty autistic teenagers and observed that masking is associated with mental health (but not necessarily in a linear relationship) and how both of them are affected by social and environmental factors. Researchers stressed the need to approach masking, authenticity, and mental health through the context of people's identities and the environment, providing implications for diagnostic services and interventions. There have been comparisons between masking and passing.

In addition to masking, researchers investigated the "authenticity" autistic people feel while socializing and observed that supportive environments, such as being around people who accept and understand them, can lead to self-awareness, reduced stress, and more positive socializing experiences than camouflaging. However, this doesn't imply that autistic "masking" is equivalent to non-authenticity. Researchers proposed that the focus should not be encouraging masking but promoting autistic authenticity, creating a more positive self-image and better mental health.

== Criticisms of methodologies ==
There are criticisms of the methodologies used in studies of autistic masking. Some may argue that studies on self-reported experiences on the Internet lack diagnostic rigor, and that comparisons between self-reported behavior and a diagnostic classification are an inaccurate measure of masking due to a number of confounds. One of these confounds is the possibility of learning skills at a later age than the general population, which is an issue because there does not exist a genetic mutation from any diagnosis of autism. This causes generalizations about learning social skills to different autism diagnoses to be biologically unsound, as well as causing self-reporting to not be considered an accurate measure. Thus, the claim stands that a difference of scores in two measures of one construct is not a validation of another construct.

The assumption that later development of an ability in early childhood necessarily entails lifelong lowering of the ability is argued to contradict the premise of different developmental trajectories, as brains that develop along different lines can and in some cases do display variations in which one variant develop an ability fast and early while another variant develops it slower but to a higher degree later on. The fact that many of the specific behaviors in neurotypical control samples differ between cultures is also cited as an argument against the claim that stress caused by the extent of use of these behaviors later in life can be linked to childhood delays of their acquisition associated with autism somehow making them "unnatural" to autistic people.

It is argued that the assumption that camouflaged autism in women must be the cause of lower rates of diagnosed autism in women than in men is circular reasoning, and that it skews research on camouflaged autism towards female samples. This further confounds the applicability of research that appears to show harmful effects of learned social skills, as compared to research on male cases of autism. The construct of camouflaged autism is argued to follow a tradition of unfruitful constructs that made quantitative testing more difficult when similarly applied to depression and schizophrenia in the past, and that allegations of stress-related harmful effects of acquiring social skills may discourage both persons formally diagnosed with autism and formally undiagnosed persons who self-diagnose with autism from learning social skills or encouraging such people to exaggerate their symptoms, similar to allegations that learning social skills would destroy special abilities in past decades.

However, the studies on gender differences in masking/camouflaging are inconsistent. Some studies found no gender differences in camouflaging with non-autistic or autistic adults. Female and males may have fundamentally different reasons to mask/camouflage with no association between compensation score and sex or age of diagnosis. In essence, more quantitative research would need to be done to unwind the criticisms of self-reporting methodologies.

== See also ==
- Discrimination against autistic people
- Minority stress
- Societal and cultural aspects of autism
