= Stigma management =

Strategies to reduce potential discrimination

Stigma management is the process of concealing or disclosing aspects of one's identity to minimize social stigma.

When a person receives unfair treatment or alienation due to a social stigma, the effects can be detrimental. Social stigmas are defined as any aspect of an individual's identity that is devalued in a social context. These stigmas can be categorized as visible or invisible, depending on whether the stigma is readily apparent to others. Visible stigmas refer to characteristics such as race, age, gender, physical disabilities, or deformities, whereas invisible stigmas refer to characteristics such sexual orientation, gender identity, religious affiliation, early pregnancy, certain diseases, or mental illnesses.

When individuals possess invisible stigmas, they must decide whether or not to reveal their association with a devalued group to others. This decision can be an incredibly difficult one, as revealing one's invisible stigma can have both positive and negative consequences depending on several situational factors. In contrast, a visible stigma requires immediate action to diminish communication tension and acknowledge a deviation from the norm. People possessing visible stigmas often use compensatory strategies to reduce potential interpersonal discrimination that they may face.

== Invisible stigma ==
Invisible stigmas are defined as "characteristics of a person that are socially devalued but are not readily apparent to others", such as having a stigmatized sexual orientation, gender identity, religious affiliation, LGBT association, early pregnancy, disease, illness, etc. Invisible social identities invoke some distinct issues that cannot be easily collapsed under traditional organizational diversity research that focuses on visible differences.

When a person possesses an invisible stigma, they have to determine how to reveal their stigmas, when to reveal their stigmas, if to reveal their stigmas, whether or not their stigmas are already known to others, and whether other people would be accepting of their stigma.

== Invisible stigma management ==
Individuals possessing invisible stigmas can choose either passing or revealing strategies in order to manage their identities when interacting with others. Passing strategies involve strategies that do not disclose the invisible stigma to others, including fabrication, concealment, and discretion. Revealing strategies involve identity management strategies that seek to disclose or reveal the invisible stigmas to others, such as signaling, normalizing, and differentiating.

=== Passing ===
Passing can be defined as "a cultural performance whereby one member of a defined social group masquerades as another in order to enjoy the privileges afforded to the dominant group". In other words, passing is simply choosing not to disclose one's invisible stigma in order to appear to be part of the dominant (i.e., not stigmatized) group. Those who pass must be constantly aware of social cues in order to avoid accidentally disclosing information about their hidden identity, a worry that most individuals from dominant groups do not share. People may rely on several different strategies for passing or concealing their invisible stigma at work. These strategies include fabrication, concealment, and discretion.

==== Fabrication ====
The fabrication strategy involves purposefully presenting false information about oneself in order to hide one's invisible stigma. Individuals using this strategy utilize deception to create a false identity in order to avoid revealing their stigmatized trait. In research involving lesbian, gay, bisexual, and transgender (LGBT) individuals, Woods identified a similar strategy called counterfeiting which is simply the act of constructing a false heterosexual identity, which also serves as a nice example of the passing strategy of fabrication. LGBT individuals engaging in this passing strategy may even go so far as to pretend they have a heterosexual partner in front of their coworkers.

==== Concealment ====
The concealment strategy involves taking preventative measures to keep others from discovering personal characteristics for fear that may reveal an individual's invisible stigma. Individuals using this strategy would not actively use deception like individuals using the fabrication strategy would, but they would still take an active role in carefully protecting themselves from revealing too much personal information. In research involving LGBT individuals, Woods has identified a very similar strategy called avoidance which is simply revealing no information about one's sexual identity in order to avoid disclosure on this topic.

==== Discretion ====
The discretion strategy is subtly different from the concealment strategy as it involves an individual avoiding questions or revealing information that is specifically related to their invisible stigma. Discretion is not as active of a passing strategy as the other two strategies, but it does involve interpersonal elusiveness and speaking in ambiguous language when the conversation threatens to potentially reveal one's stigmatized identity. An example of this strategy (and a way to distinguish it from concealment) would be a person who is very willing to reveal personal information to their coworker but is also very reluctant to discuss any topics that they think may be related to their invisible stigma.

=== Revealing ===
When a person chooses to unveil an otherwise invisible stigma to their coworkers, they are choosing to reveal their stigma in that situation. Individuals may vary in the degree to which they reveal invisible stigmas to their coworkers. For example, employees may choose to reveal their stigma to everyone they encounter, or they might judiciously choose a select few that they are comfortable with telling about their invisible stigma. People may rely on several different strategies for revealing their invisible stigmas at work. These strategies include signaling, normalizing, and differentiating.

==== Signaling ====
The signaling strategy involves avoiding complete disclosure of one's invisible stigma to his/her coworkers. Rather, people who use this strategy tend to drop hints and send signals to their coworkers without having to completely reveal their invisible stigma. Examples of signals may include the use of cryptic language, bringing up conversation topics that are specific to a stigmatized group, using symbols that are specific to a stigmatized group, and/or the use of nonverbal cues consistent with one's stigmatized group membership. Individuals using this strategy are essentially inviting others to discover their stigma by providing enough clues for peers without directly revealing their stigma.

==== Normalizing ====
The normalizing strategy involves revealing one's invisible stigma, but then minimizing its significance as to appear just as normal as everyone else. While this strategy does involve disclosure of one's invisible stigma, it also involves an attempt by stigmatized individuals to assimilate into organizations effectively and establish as normal of an existence as they can. Researchers have suggested that this strategy helps stigmatized individuals strike a balance between the desire to reveal their stigma and dealing with the consequences that may result from their disclosure.

==== Differentiating ====
The differentiating strategy involves not only revealing one's invisible stigma, but also emphasizing it and how it differentiates one from others. People who use this strategy try to eliminate unfair judgment by presenting their identity as equally acceptable when compared to others. Some researchers have referred to this strategy as deploying one's identity, citing individuals who reveal their stigmas in order to test the perceptions of dominant organizational groups in an effort to inspire organizational change.

=== Antecedents ===
==== Organizational diversity climate ====
Diversity climate is a term coined by Tsui and Gutek referring to social norms of acceptance or discrimination established within a workplace environment. Research has shown that accepting work environments promote more open communication (i.e., revealing) among their employees with invisible stigmas. Accepting work environments can include supportive coworkers, supportive managers, or simply the presence of other individuals who have revealed their invisible stigma without experiencing negative consequences (Ragins & Cornwell, 2007).

==== Professional and industry norms ====
The norms of one's overarching industry may have implications for stigmatized individuals' likelihood of passing or revealing in the workplace. Indeed, some have noted that individuals working for conservative industries such as the military may be less likely to reveal their stigma than individuals who work in industries that may actually encourage employees to disclose personal information about themselves, like human services.

==== Legal protections ====
Some individuals with invisible stigmas are protected under laws at various governmental levels (i.e., local, state, and/or federal), while others are not considered among these protected groups. Not surprisingly, those with invisible stigmas that are protected under law (e.g., disability) are more likely to reveal their stigma than those with invisible stigmas that are not protected under law (e.g., sexual orientation). It's also important to note that, in the case of disability status, stigmatized individuals may actually be required to reveal their stigma in order to receive certain workplace benefits.

==== Interpersonal context ====
An individual's likelihood of passing or revealing is also affected by the relationship they have with the person they are interacting with as well as the demographic characteristics of the person they are interacting with. Understandably, individuals are more willing to reveal stigmatized information to those that they trust. Additionally, an individual may be more likely to reveal their invisible stigma to a person who possesses the same stigma. Finally, individuals may be generally more likely to reveal their stigmas to females than to males, believing females to be more effective communicators, especially regarding sensitive topics.

==== Propensity toward risk-taking ====
Given that individuals vary in their willingness to take risks, the idea has been proposed that individuals higher in risk-taking propensity will be more likely to reveal their stigma at work than those who are lower in risk-taking propensity. This prediction stems from the fact that choosing to reveal an invisible stigma at work could be a very risky decision, especially if one receives (or perceives that they will receive) discriminatory treatment as a result of their disclosure.

==== Self-monitoring ====
Self-monitoring can be defined as the act of controlling and managing the impression one puts forward to ensure that social roles and expectations are being met. While self-monitoring ability may not be directly related to passing or revealing behaviors, it likely is related to choosing effective strategies for managing one's identity. Research has stated that high self-monitors are better able to examine their environment for signs of acceptance when deciding to pass or reveal, while low self-monitors may have more trouble effectively managing the impressions they are making.

==== Development stage ====
An adult's level of sophistication and how developed their stigmatized identity is may also have an effect on individuals' willingness to reveal an invisible stigma. Highly developed individuals with stigmas that are central to their self-concept tend to see their stigmatized identity equally valid as other identities, and thus should theoretically not be as afraid to reveal it to others. Indeed, research has shown that individuals who ultimately reveal their stigmatized identity tend to be more assured of that identity than individuals who choose to pass.

=== Consequences ===
==== Consequences of passing ====
The main issue that can arise from passing is that the individual feels as though they are not being true to themselves, which can create an inner sense of turmoil and lead to psychological strain for the person hiding their identity. Additionally, fears associated with revealing one's invisible stigma (among those who are currently passing) have been shown to lead to a myriad of negative workplace consequences, including lowered job satisfaction, less organizational commitment, and higher turnover intentions. Interpersonal consequences can also arise when an individual is passing by not revealing much personal information in the workplace. These consequences include strained social relationships, social isolation, and limited mentoring opportunities.

==== Consequences of revealing ====
Although revealing could have the positive effect of reducing the psychological strain and dissonance associated with passing strategies, many negative consequences could also result from revealing a devalued stigmatized identity. Potential consequences include opening oneself up to prejudice and discriminatory treatment at work. These negative consequences could become magnified if stigmas are revealed in an organization that is not supportive of the individual's invisible stigma. However, if an individual can produce social change and reduce their dissonance associated with passing by revealing their stigma, revealing in the workplace might end up being worth the risk in the long run. It is also important to note that revealing is not always a voluntary activity. For example, disabled individuals who require accommodation in the workplace must disclose the nature of their disability in order to obtain benefits under the Americans with Disabilities Act. This disclosure often unintentionally forces a person to reveal when their disability would otherwise be invisible to others.

== The disclosure processes model ==
As summarized in the above sections, individuals with invisible stigmas engage in stigma management by making decisions about whether to pass or to reveal as well as the specific strategies they will use to do so. These decisions may lead to both positive and negative consequences depending on the situation. The Disclosure Processes Model (DPM) provides an explanation for when disclosure (revealing) is beneficial for individuals with invisible stigmas. Unlike the majority of studies on stigma management, DPM views disclosure as an ongoing process, as people with invisible stigmas must constantly make decisions regarding when to reveal and when to conceal their stigmas throughout their lifetime. This model suggests that disclosure can lead to a number of different outcomes at the individual, dyadic, and social contextual levels. Also, this model suggests that alleviation of inhibition, social support, and changes in social information mediate the effect of disclosure on these outcomes. In summary, the model highlights the impact of five main components in this process— the antecedent goals, the disclosure event itself, the mediating processes, the outcomes, and the feedback loop.

=== Antecedent goals ===
One main contribution of the disclosure processes model is to incorporate dispositional factors, namely antecedent goals, into the process of stigma management. The DPM posits that disclosure is regulated by the goal orientation (either approach-focused or avoidance-focused) held by individuals. Approach-focused goals are associated with attention to positive stimuli, positive affect, and approach-focused coping strategies, whereas avoidance-focused goals are associated with attention to negative stimuli, negative effect, and avoidance-focused coping strategies. The model suggests that goals influence outcomes throughout the entire disclosure process. Therefore, it is critical to understand how the goal orientations lead people to disclose in order to understand when disclosure is beneficial.

=== Disclosure event ===
A disclosure event is defined by Chaudoir and Fisher as "the verbal communication that occurs between a discloser and a interaction partner regarding the discloser's possession of a concealable stigmatized identity". It can range from explicitly talking about invisible stigmas with the interaction partner to first "testing the waters" by introducing the topic indirectly before fully disclosing. During the disclosure event, the content – overall depth, breadth, duration, and emotional content – can impact the reaction of the interaction partner, The positive reactions of the interaction partner can, in turn, influence the discloser's behavior.

==== Goals and the disclosure event ====
The model predicts that disclosure goals affect the content of the disclosure event and the interaction partner response. On one hand, individuals with avoidance-focused goals disclose less frequently because they tend to focus on avoiding the possibility of social rejection and conflict. When they do decide to disclose, these individuals tend to use certain disclosure methods that they believe can minimize their psychological distress by social rejection (e.g. sending an email rather than talking face to face with the interaction partner). By using these methods, however, the disclosure is more likely to be perceived negatively by the interaction partners.

On the other hand, individuals with approach-focused goals tend to focus on the possibility of gaining social support, therefore use more direct communication strategies. They are also shown to be better at self-regulating and are more attuned to the presence of supportive interaction partner reactions. As a result, individuals with approach-focused goals may be more likely to benefit from disclosure than individuals with avoidance-focused goals.

=== Disclosure mediating processes and outcomes ===
==== Alleviation of inhibition ====
People with avoidance goals tend to be more sensitive to the possibility of social rejection and are likely to adopt avoidant coping strategies to deal with information about their identity. Therefore, they tend to experience distress or difficulty coping with their concealable stigma because they typically use passing strategies. Through alleviation of inhibition mechanism, in which people are offered the opportunity to express previously suppressed emotions and thoughts, the DPM states that these individuals may actually be most likely to benefit from disclosure.

==== Social support ====
One of the negative consequences of passing is strained social relationship with co-workers, as stated in the previous section. Therefore, disclosure can have a substantial impact on well-being as a result of obtaining social support. For example, disclosure of sexual orientation in the workplace leads to greater job satisfaction and lower job anxiety if positive reactions to disclosures are received from co-workers. In other words, receiving positive reactions from interaction partners through disclosure can lead to positive outcomes in the workplace. The DPM suggests that people who possess approach-focused goals utilize more complex self-regulatory strategies that are critical throughout the full disclosure process (e.g. selecting appropriate interaction partners, communicating effectively about sensitive information), and therefore, they may be more likely to benefit from disclosure through collecting greater social support.

==== Changes in social information ====
A fundamental change in social information occurs after disclosing as people and their disclosure interaction partners now share or "co-own" information about the concealable stigma. The disclosure can then dramatically impact subsequent individual behavior, specific interactions between the discloser and confidant, and interactions within the broader social context. For instance, after employees disclosure, they may raise awareness of their identities and, as a consequence, effectively reduce the related stigma throughout the organization. Moreover, the model makes a suggestion on the role of goals among the three mediation processes. Specifically, in terms of predicting positive outcomes, goals may not play as a significant role in Changes in Social Information as in the other two processes. This is probably because Changes in Social Information result from the objective informational content of the identity whereas the Alleviation of Inhibition and Social Support result from self-regulatory effects of disclosure goals.

=== Feedback loop ===
The DPM suggests that a singular disclosure event can affect both future disclosure likelihood and long-term psychological benefits. Approach-focused disclosure goals may maintain upward spirals toward greater visibility by gradually benefiting the disclosure, while avoidance-focused disclosure goals may initiate downward spirals toward greater concealment by gradually de-benefiting the disclosure. In upward spirals, individuals feel disclosing their identity more comfortably, greater support for their identity, viewing themselves more positively, and possessing a more unified sense of self. On the other hand, there are opposite effects on individuals who fall into the downward spirals.

=== Practical implications ===
One important implication of the disclosure processes model is that there are individual differences in whether interpersonal disclosure can be beneficial. Individuals with avoidance-focused goals engage in self-regulatory efforts that weaken their ability collecting positive responses from their confidants, which also increases their chances of social rejection. This group of people may be best served by other methods of disclosure, such as by disclosing in expressive writing or therapeutic settings where they are protected from receiving social rejection.

The model also suggests that interventions with a focus on encouraging individuals to explicitly identify their disclosure goals may be one effective strategy in maximizing the benefits of disclosure. Therefore, practitioners are recommended to screen and identify individuals with strong avoidance-focused disclosure goals and assist them in setting new, approach-focused disclosure goals or helping them find alternative methods of disclosure (e.g., written disclosure).

== Visible stigmas ==
Visible stigmas are defined as physical characteristics that are socially devalued and are readily apparent to others, such as race, age, gender, and physical disabilities or deformities.

== Visible stigma management ==
Visible stigma management is very different from the management of invisible stigmas. However, when invisible stigmas shift along the continuum from being completely invisible to completely visible, they begin to operate in ways that are similar to visible stigmas. In other words, once an invisible stigma becomes visible (by wearing clothes or markers that identify one's self, or by being 'outed' by others), that stigma can then be managed in similar ways as visible stigmas. In order to manage visible stigmas (or stigmas that have been made apparent to others), targets must engage in compensatory strategies, including acknowledgement, providing individuating information, and increased positivity. These strategies are used to pre-emptively reduce interpersonal discrimination that may occur as a result of an explicitly apparent stigma.

=== Compensatory strategies ===
Several studies show that people with visible stigmas do in fact use compensatory strategies. When women believe that their writing will be evaluated by a sexist grader, they attempt to portray themselves as having non-traditional gender roles. Similarly, when black individuals are informed that they will be interacting with somebody who is a racist, they disclosed more information to their interaction partners. They were also rated by independent coders as being more engaged, more interactive, and warmer when interacting with targets that were perceived to be prejudice towards blacks than when they interacted with targets that were not perceived to have this prejudice. Lastly, obese women behave differently when they feel that their interaction partners can see them versus when they think that they can't be seen. When obese women believe that they are visible to their interaction partners, they use more likeable and socially skilled behaviors compared to when they think they can not be seen. This is likely done to counteract the negative prejudice that most people have against obese women. Taken together, these studies all demonstrate that individuals with stigmas do utilize a series of compensatory strategies in order to manage their visible stigmas.

==== Acknowledgement ====
Several studies have shown that people with visible stigmas engage in the compensatory strategy of acknowledgement, referring to the act of openly addressing one's stigma. This strategy has been shown to be effective in improving perceptions of people with visible stigmas. For instance, individuals with visible physical disabilities are less likely to be viewed with disdain, pity, or contempt when they explicitly acknowledged their physical disability. Researchers have proposed that this effect is due to the fact that acknowledging one's stigma releases discomfort and tension during an interaction and that not acknowledging one's stigma is viewed as an attempt to ignore or avoid talking about one's stigma. Acknowledging has been proposed to be effective in cases where it increases perceptions of adjustment within the stigmatized individual and reduces the suppression of negative stigma-related thoughts on the part of the perceivers. In a study on job applicants with visible stigmas, applicants who used the strategy of acknowledgement received less interpersonal discrimination than those who did not, as rated by both the applicants and independent raters.

==== Individuating information ====
Some individuals with visible stigmas also adopt the compensatory strategy of providing individuating information to their interaction partners. This information allows the interaction partner to evaluate the target on an individual level rather than as a product of their stigma. When interaction partners are not given any information about a stigmatized individual, they tend to use stereotypes about that person's stigma during evaluation. For instance, when told to select a leader, both men and women tend to select male leaders rather than female leaders when given no other information. However, when additional information is given about the individual, people are less likely to rely on their stereotypes. Similarly, when job applicants with visible stigmas provide individuating information to hiring managers, they are able to partially reduce the amount of interpersonal discrimination that they face .

==== Increased positivity ====
Lastly, some individuals with visible stigmas choose to use the compensatory strategy of increased positivity in order to manage their identities. These individuals change their verbal, para-verbal, and nonverbal behaviors to increase the positivity and likeability of their interactions with others. As an example, black students tend to demonstrate behaviors that are more engaging and likeable during the interaction when told that their interaction partners are prejudiced. Similar findings have been found with overweight individuals feeling they are being stereotyped. Several studies indicate that individuals with visible stigmas do indeed try to demonstrate positive behaviors when interacting with other individuals, especially with those who are perceived to be especially prejudiced. They do so with the intention of decreasing potential negativity or discrimination that they may face and potentially increasing the perceptions of their stigmatized group. In one study on job applicants with visible stigmas, those who used the strategy of increased positivity were found to remediate the interpersonal discrimination that they faced, as rated by the applicants, observers, and independent coders.

== Solutions for organizations ==
When an organization enforces clear policies and practices that forbid discrimination based on sexual orientation, LGBT employees report less discrimination, which should lead to fewer lawsuits and turnover. When an organization voluntarily adopts policies that demonstrate an accepting and non-judgmental environment, a person can seek support for their stigma (e.g., domestic partner benefits). Pregnant women in work environments that use supplementing policies (such as paid leave or remote work) often stay at work into the late stages of pregnancy, and usually return sooner compared to women at unaccommodating organizations. Practices such as these not only benefit the individual, but they also benefit the organization in the long run. Training employees, managers, and supervisors through diversity workshops serves to better educate everyone on the misconceptions surrounding LGBT workers, and should be used to address other stigmas as well. By presenting facts and defining inappropriate behaviors, organizations show their acceptance and tolerance of stigmas. When affirmative policies and practices are up-front and seem sincere, stigmatized groups face less discrimination, which should lead to higher employee morale, and greater workplace productivity.

== Limitations with existing research and future directions ==
=== Issue of measurement ===
One major issue that has been raised in regard to identity management is an issue of measurement. Some researchers have expressed that research cannot move forward without appropriate measurement techniques and appropriately conceptualized behaviors for passing and revealing in the workplace. Indeed, it can be hard to distinguish between the passing behaviors identified by Herek. As for future research, other researchers have called for a better understanding of the underlying processes involved in the decision to disclose in addition to increased specificity in the classification of groups with invisible stigmas.

=== Problems with dichotomizing stigma ===
Past research has simplified identity management strategies by dichotomizing stigma into purely visible or purely invisible. This is not the case, however, in that stigmas are never completely visible or completely invisible. Oftentimes, people can tell (to some degree) whether or not the person they are interacting with has an invisible stigma, even before that person engages in disclosure behaviors. This can be due to visual, audio, or movement-based cues, or due to rumors told by other co-workers. Researchers should begin to study the degree to which people with a stigmatized identity choose to either express or suppress their concealable stigma when that stigma is somewhat known by the interaction partner.

=== Future directions ===
Researchers have called for future studies to focus on invisible stigma in groups, the timing and trust involved in revealing, and the potential for organizational change as a result of revealing strategies. Researchers should examine how individuals possessing invisible stigmas affect the performance of a group. Additionally, researchers may examine how a group's effectiveness in responding to a disclosure of an invisible stigma could positively or negatively affect future group outcomes. Furthermore, researchers have yet to determine how the timing of disclosure affects the disclosure interaction. Some studies suggest that disclosing later in the interaction leads to the most benefit. When individuals disclose too early in an interaction, they cause their interaction partners to feel uncomfortable, and the partners may feel as though they must also disclose private information. When individuals discloses too late in an interaction, they may hurt the interaction because they will be seen as dishonest and not trusting of the relationship to have revealed earlier on in the interaction. Lastly, there is an opportunity for researchers to study how organizations can change when employees decide to reveal vs. conceal their invisible stigmas. When employees with invisible stigmas choose to conceal their stigma, it could lead to continued institutionalized stigmatization of those social characteristics. On the other hand, when employees choose to disclose, the level of acceptance of their disclosure can have far-reaching consequences for the climate and environment of organizations. Disclosure interactions that are met with positivity and acceptance could lead future employees to feel open and free to express their potentially stigmatized characteristics with less fear of judgment.

== See also ==
- Alter ego
- Americans with Disabilities Act
- Beard (companion)
- Closet Jew
- Closeted
- Coping (psychology)
- Defense mechanism
- Dignity
- Discrimination
- Workplace diversity
- Dramaturgy (sociology)
- He never married
- Impression management
- Job satisfaction
- Masking (behavior)
- Medieval singlewomen
- Minority stress
- Model minority
- Normalization
- Organizational commitment
- Passing
- Prejudice
- Self-monitoring
- Social isolation
- Social stigma
- Stereotype
- Turnover (employment)
