= Racial battle fatigue =

Stress response

Racial battle fatigue is a term coined in 2003 to describe the psychosocial stress responses from being a racially oppressed group member in society and on a historically White campus. The term was introduced by William A. Smith, a professor in the Division of Ethnic Studies and Department of Education, Culture, and Society at the University of Utah. The framework intends to offer a lens to better understand racial undertones of a campus environment and educational experiences for people of color. Smith's research was originally conducted on Black faculty, both men and women, and then on Black college students, prior to a more focused examination on African American men. Since this earlier period of research, racial battle fatigue scholarship has been used to include other racially marginalized groups. The phenomenon builds on existing research connecting African Americans and other people of color with oppression and discrimination experienced at historically White institutions. Smith incorporates literature on combat trauma and combat stress syndrome to help understand the effects of managing hostile environments and the ensuing persistent stress.

== Psychological and physiological symptoms ==
Psychological symptoms can include but are not limited to: depression, chronic anxiety, anger, frustration, shock, disturbed sleep, disappointment, resentment, emotional or social withdrawal, intrusive thoughts or images, avoidance, helplessness, and fear. Acceptance of racist attributions, or internalized racism, may also be a psychosocial response. Physiological symptoms such as high blood pressure, headaches, increased breathing and heart rate in anticipation of racial conflict, upset stomach, ulcers, fatigue, exhaustion, and muscle tension around the neck, shoulders, and head may be present due to the persistent nature of the stress experienced. Clark and colleagues proposed that these stress responses are also related to cardiovascular reactivity and higher rates of hypertension among African Americans. Moreover, prolonged activation of sympathetic responses may result in higher resting systolic blood pressure and increases in mean arterial blood pressure.

It has been well-documented that Black male college students experience greater dropout and lower grades. When compared with their Black female counterparts, Black males were also more likely to drop out of high school and college. Researchers asserted that the distress and academic attrition that may be present with Black males at historically White universities should not be attributed to their lack of academic preparedness, rather the aftermath of subtle and cumulative racial discrimination that occurs in those places. One of Smith's earliest studies on racial battle fatigue gathered 36 African American college students enrolled in historically white university campuses into focus groups with guided discussions. During the time of the study, the students had been enrolled at: Harvard University; University of California, Berkeley; University of Michigan, University of Michigan Law School; University of Illinois at Urbana-Champaign; and Michigan State University. The students reported psychological responses aligned with racial battle fatigue and all perceived the college environment to be more hostile towards African American males than other groups. Consistent patterns described by the students involved experiences of hypersurvellience and control from white people and anti-Black stereotyping. Another published article on the findings from the study expressed stereotyping and scrutinizing from campus police officers. One student recounted an incident while at UC Berkeley:

"[At] Underhill [residence hall], all last semester, almost every night, there’s Whites, there’s Asians in Underhill playing Frisbee, or playing football, or what have you at one o’clock in the morning. [They are] out there yelling, having a good time, and never [having] any problems. So, me and my friends [all Black males] are out there about to play some football, and it’s like 11 o’clock. All of a sudden, UCBP [UC-Berkeley Police] sweeps up. First, it’s one car, and they get out the car and it’s like, ‘We got some complaints. You guys need to leave.’ Mind you, there’s about maybe 10 of us and we’re out there still just tossing the football around. Then, after [the UCBP officer] is there for maybe about two minutes, all of a sudden from this entrance over here, we have two other [UCBP squad] cars swooping in on Underhill lot."

Despite stating to the police rationally that they were using campus property, the student and his friends were asked to leave or be arrested. The messages perceived by the students is that they as [Black males] were unwanted, unvalued, and not as respected compared to his other non-Black college peers. This experience may also reflects community policing tactics employed by the police against Black males as a larger systemic issue.

== Research ==
=== On African American male students ===
For a person of color, being on the receiving end of racial slights can manifest in an unabating balance of time and energy in determining if they are motivated by a racist intent and if they are worthy of responding to. Smith stated that many African American boys and adults "will perceive their environment as extremely stressful, exhausting, and diminishing to their senses of control, comfort, and meaning while eliciting feelings of loss, ambiguity, strain, frustration, and injustice" because of chronic racial microaggressions and overt racism (also called, racial macroaggressions). The accumulation of emotional and physiological symptoms resulting from subtle and overt forms of racial verbal and nonverbal microaggressions at the societal, interpersonal, and institutional level can lead to traumatic psychological and physiological stress symptoms.

=== On Latino students ===
A 2014 research study assessed if Latino students experience similar psychological and physiological stress responses on college campuses following racialized incidents that Smith described for African American males. They found that the common experiences of racial microaggressions were interpersonal, non-verbal, institutional, racial jokes and remarks, low teacher expectations, and false assumptions based on stereotypes. Moreover, they upheld that Latino experience more psychological stress because of racial microaggressions. As such, the stress responses highlighted by racial battle fatigue is quantitively linked to Latino students.

=== Limitations ===
The African American male experiences described in the earlier studies conducted cannot be generalized to other people of color, females, or African American females. The study assessing Latina/o students with racial battle fatigue had a small sample size and did not differentiate between gender. Smith and his research teams have addressed this criticism in more recent studies. For instance, in his study, "The Impact of Racial Microaggressions Across Educational Attainment for African Americans (Smith, W.A., Franklin, J.D., & Hung, M, 2020), there was an effective sample size over 3,000 participants. Additionally, many other researchers using the racial battle fatigue framework have similar or greater sample sizes in their study.

== See also ==
- Black fatigue
