= Julia Zaher =

Israeli Arab philanthropist

- جوليا زهر
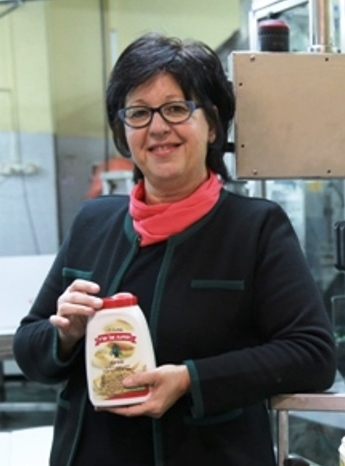
- Zaher in 2014
- Occupations: Businessperson; philanthropist; schoolteacher
- Known for: Al Arz Tahini
- Children: 2

Julia Zaher (Arabic: جوليا زهر, Hebrew: ג'וליה זהר) is an Israeli Arab businessperson, philanthropist, and former schoolteacher. She is owner and CEO of Al Arz Tahini, a tahini manufacturing company. She is known for her philanthropic actions to benefit women's rights, people with disabilities, and LGBT health.

== Career ==
Zaher's family background is Arab Christian. She was a schoolteacher for decades before taking over Al Arz Tahini, her husband's tahini company, in 2003. Upon taking over the company, which was established in 1992, Zaher paid off its debts and upgraded the manufacturing process. Al Arz's two factories produce 20 to 25 tons of tahini a day from sesame seeds imported from Ethiopia. The products are sold in Israel and exported to 18 countries. Zaher is the only Arab female factory owner in Israel. She is an advocate for diversity and women in the workplace. Her company employs a large number of Arab women in addition to Jewish, Muslim, and Christian residents from Jezreel Valley.

Zaher is recognized for her philanthropy. She has donated towards women's rights and people with disabilities. In 2020, she donated to The Aguda – Israel's LGBT Task Force to establish a crisis hotline for LGBT Arabic-speaking Israelis. Zaher was lauded by several politicians and LGBT rights activists, while more conservative Arab-Israelis criticized for the donation, claiming it may lead to "normalization" of an LGBT lifestyle. The donation sparked a boycott of her company among social conservatives. In response, Israeli diplomats bought over 600 pounds of tahini from Al Arz.

As of 2021, the company had experienced a 30% sales increased in the past three years.

In 2022, Zaher was given Tel Aviv University's Hugo Ramniceanu Prize for Economics in honor of her entrepreneurship and community leadership. Zaher donated her prize money back to the university, to fund a nursing studies scholarship for Arab-Israeli students. That same year, Zaher received an honorary doctorate from Bar-Ilan University.

== Personal life ==
Zaher is from Nazareth and has two children. Her husband died from a heart attack in 2003.
