= Winn Kelly Brooks =

American researcher and scholar

- Born: Virginia Rae Brooks; December 24, 1938; Wichita Falls, Texas
- Died: October 7, 2008 (aged 69)
- Known for: minority stress theory

Academic background
- Education: University of California-Berkeley

Academic work
- Discipline: Social work

Winn Kelly Brooks (formerly Virginia Rae Brooks; December 24, 1938 – October 7, 2008) was an American researcher and scholar in the field of minority stress theory. She is recognized as a pioneer of the concept of minority stress in sexual minority populations. Brooks completed a Doctorate in Social Work (DSW) and Social Welfare at University of California-Berkeley and published Minority Stress and Lesbian Women in 1981.

== Research on minority stress theory ==
Brook's dissertation on minority stress in lesbian women explored the unique stressors and challenges faced by lesbians as members of a stigmatized minority group. This represented the first research study to use the term "minority stress" as it pertained to sexual and gender minorities and to explore the individual, community and systematic barriers that contribute to poor health outcomes. Her research originated in a study on lesbian women recruited at a 1975 meeting of the National Organization of Women (NOW) in San Francisco, shortly after women had been expelled from and then allowed back into NOW. This research brought in survey feedback from 275 women. She explored cultural, social, and economic stress that sexual minority women are exposed to, and the impacts of these on physical and psychological health.

Brooks also originated a scale for assessing global helpfulness of therapists that continues to be employed in research on therapy practice, and her work set a precedent for examining the therapist-client match on sexual orientation. Her findings that lesbian and heterosexual female therapists are rated more helpful by lesbian clients than heterosexual male therapists have been replicated by subsequent studies.

== Research legacy ==
The concept of minority stress was popularized in 1995 by Ilan Meyer in his research, "Minority Stress and Health in Gay Men". In the early 2000s, Meyer publicly credited the work of Brooks despite not initially noting the origins of these concepts. Despite her contribution to minority stress research for LGBTQIA+ populations, the work of Brooks remains relatively unrecognized in the field of minority stress theory, social work, and psychology.

Brooks' work on minority stress theory has been referenced as a framework for research outside the area of sexual minority populations, including research about child-free populations. Her research was also drawn on as a framework for the Institute of Medicine (US) Committee on Lesbian, Gay, Bisexual, and Transgender Health Issues and Research Gaps and Opportunities 2011 report on The Health of Lesbian, Gay, Bisexual, and Transgender People: Building a Foundation for Better Understanding.
