= Normalization (sociology) =

Social processes through which ideas and actions come to be seen as normal

Normalization refers to social processes through which ideas and actions come to be seen as 'normal' and become taken-for-granted or 'natural' in everyday life. There are different behavioral attitudes that humans accept as normal, such as grief for a loved one's suffering or death, avoiding danger, and not participating in cannibalism.

== Foucault ==
The concept of normalization can be found in the work of Michel Foucault, especially Discipline and Punish, in the context of his account of disciplinary power. As Foucault used the term, normalization involved the construction of an idealized norm of conduct – for example, the way a proper soldier ideally should stand, march, present arms, and so on, as defined in minute detail – and then rewarding or punishing individuals for conforming to or deviating from this ideal. In Foucault's account, normalization was one of an ensemble of tactics for exerting the maximum social control with the minimum expenditure of force, which Foucault calls "disciplinary power". Disciplinary power emerged over the course of the 19th century, came to be used extensively in military barracks, hospitals, asylums, schools, factories, offices, and so on, and hence became a crucial aspect of social structure in modern societies.

In Security, Territory, Population, a lecture given at the Collège de France in 1978, Foucault defined normalization thus:

Normalization consists first of all in positing a model, an optimal model that is constructed in terms of a certain result, and the operation of disciplinary normalization consists in trying to get people, movements, and actions to conform to this model, the normal being precisely that which can conform to this norm, and the abnormal that which is incapable of conforming to the norm. In other words, it is not the normal and the abnormal that is fundamental and primary in disciplinary normalization, it is the norm. That is, there is an originally prescriptive character of the norm and the determination and the identification of the normal and the abnormal becomes possible in relation to this posited norm.

== Normalization process theory ==
Normalization process theory is a middle-range theory used mainly in medical sociology and science and technology studies to provide a framework for understanding the social processes by which new ways of thinking, working and organizing become routinely incorporated in everyday work. Normalization process theory has its roots in empirical studies of technological innovation in healthcare, and especially in the evaluation of complex interventions.

Normalization process theory covers four primary domains: (i) sense-making that creates coherence, (ii) organizing mental activity to manifest cognitive participation related to the behavior, (iii) operationalizing the behaviour through collective action, and (iv) appraising and adapting behaviours through reflexive monitoring. Implementation of a normalization process can be studied through the "NPT toolkit".

For example, the responses may indicate that the intervention ‘makes sense’ to participants (Coherence), but that specific aspects of engagement (Cognitive Participation) appear low, suggesting that further effort could be targeted at broadening participation or working on participants’ commitment to making the intervention work.

== See also ==
- Abusive power and control
- Child grooming
- Gradualism
- Legitimisation
- Overton window
- Rape culture
- Stigma management
- Stockholm syndrome
