= San Antonio Observer =

African-American newspaper in Texas

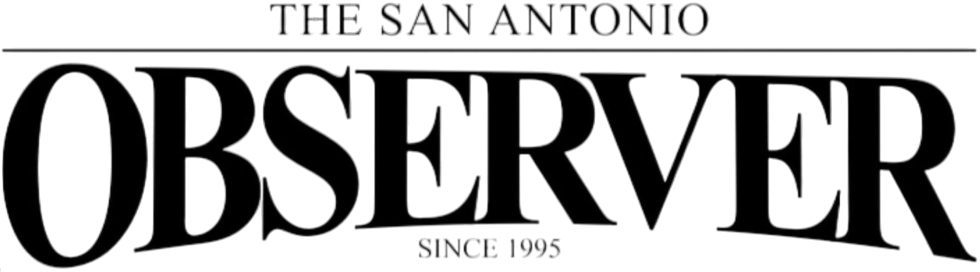

- Front page of the newspaper on May 8, 2024
- Type: Free newspaper, weekly newspaper, African American newspaper
- Owner: Wassem Ali
- Founder: Hussan Ali
- Publisher: Stephanie Zarriello
- Founded: 1995: 30 years ago
- City: San Antonio
- Country: United States
- Circulation: 10,000+
- Readership: 25,000+
- Website: saobserver.com

The San Antonio Observer is a free weekly African-American newspaper founded in 1995 in San Antonio, Texas, by Hussan Ali. The newspaper is considered to be the largest black-owned news outlet in South Texas. The newspaper's director since 2011 is Wassem Ali. San Antonio Observer's reports are local, they cover political news and popular culture. Wassem Ali said the newspaper's goal is "delivering news from a Black perspective".

== History ==
The San Antonio Observer was founded in 1995 by Hussan Ali, father of Wassem Ali, in San Antonio. Leadership of the newspaper was given to Wassem Ali in 2011, Hussan Ali later died in 2018. Wassem Ali said the newspaper is weekly and its goal is to deliver "news from a Black perspective". The newspaper's coverage is local, it reports on various topics ranging from local politics and popular culture. It is the only black-owned newspaper in San Antonio and reportedly the largest Black-owned publication in South Texas. The newspaper is sold free of charge at newsstands and has a website, which is said to have significantly increased the publication's popularity, especially in East Texas. Wassem Ali said his wife, Stephanie Zarriello, works as the newspaper's editor and publisher. Historian Mario Salas also writes for the newspaper, he called it “the voice of the Black community” in an interview with KSAT-TV. Radio show host Doug Heath wrote for the newspaper till his death in 2022.

The San Antonio Observer typically covers topics related to San Antonio's Black community and sometimes publishes satirical articles. Wassem Ali said the newspaper reports on voting rights, social justice and public safety, he described it as a "controversial" publication that is seen differently compared to other outlets. The newspaper's journalism was criticized by the San Antonio Current in 2007, claiming its reporting was biased and sometimes contained conflicts of interest with its subjects. It also criticized Wassem Ali, claiming he is unfamiliar with fact-checking and journalistic ethics.

The headquarters of San Antonio Observer are located in the garage of Wassem Ali's residence, the garage was the founding site of the newspaper. As of 2024, its walls are covered with the newspaper's most offensive covers. The newspaper is known in the city for publishing inappropriate illustrations of people in its covers, Waseem Ali said his father wanted San Antonio Observer to mimic the style of the New York Post and create attention grabbing illustrations. According to the San Antonio Observer's ad, it sells more than 10,000 newspapers every Wednesday at 62 locations, and has a weekly readership of approximately 25,000 people.

== Incidents ==
=== Inflammatory covers ===
In 2005, the newspaper published a print article with a photoshopped cover that showed politician Phil Hardberger sitting on a toilet with his pants off. In March 2006, the newspaper published a photoshopped cover that showed a SAPD officer wearing Ku Klux Klan hood. Spokesman of SAPD, Joe Rios, accused the newspaper of defaming the officer shown in the cover due to his badge number being seen. In 2009, the newspaper published a cover featuring San Antonio police chief William McManus and two officers photoshopped to look like 1930s-style gangsters with a headline: "SAPD RAPIST". In February 2015, the newspaper published an article that criticized judge Nelson Wolff for saying the n-word. The article's cover showed Wolff's face with a headline: "No Niggers Allowed". Hattie Kelly, president of Texas Publishers Association, condemned the newspaper shortly after.

=== Headline plagiarism ===
In October 2007, the newspaper's editors admitted that one of their colleagues has copied headlines from the San Antonio Express-News in four published articles. Yvonne Armstrong, spokesperson of San Antonio Observer, apologized for the plagiarism and blamed the incident on an "inexperienced individual". Armstrong also promised to print a special story on October 30 where the staff would apologize. The infringing articles were reportedly published between October 24 and 30, on October 24 three of them were exposed by Express News of having plagiarized headlines.

=== Shooting of Antronie Scott ===
In February 2016, a man by the name Antronie Scott was shot and killed by SAPD officer, who mistook his phone for a handgun. Editor Stephanie Zarriello reacted to the incident and said he was "unjustly murdered", at a press conference held by the newspaper's staff, she stated that the anonymity of police officers in shootings causes their crimes go unpunished. She compared them to Ku Klux Klan and said that San Antonio Observer may publish the names of all SAPD officers to "protect the community". Her comments sparked negative reactions on social media, with Facebook users criticizing her. Zarriello responded and said she was misrepresented. She said she never planned to publish any personal information about the officers and simply wanted to make them "think twice before shooting so fast". Offices of San Antonio Observer received big amounts of phone calls from various states, with some reportedly saying death threats. Some social media users recommened to dox Zarriello in retaliation. Texarkana Gazette criticized her, saying that her leaking the names of SAPD officers can put their families in danger and may cause Zarriello to have "blood on her hands".
