= Islam Zaher =

Egyptian contemporary artist (born 1972)

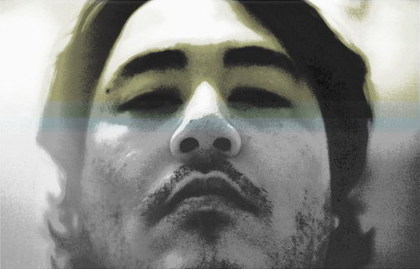
- Islam Zaher in 2003
- Born: Islam Abd El Azim Zaher; 15 March 1972 (age 54); Cairo, Egypt
- Occupations: Artist, Painter
- Years active: 1994–present

Islam Zaher (born 15 March 1972) is an Egyptian contemporary artist. Born and raised in Cairo, Egypt, Zaher was fascinated by art and paintings from an early age. A graduate of Fine Arts in Zamalek, Cairo, 1994,

== Early work ==
The early paintings of Islam Zaher focused on the human figure. In 1994, in his graduation project, Zaher depicted naked male figures lying in bed while covering their faces with their hands. Zaher returned to this same theme in later years. The project, a triptych, was inspired by the idea of mental illness and the struggles of the inner self.

Shortly after graduation, Zaher visited the same concept with a drawing with pastels of a male nude sitting on a wooden chair in a seeming silence but vibrating with charges of trapped emotions. The pastel drawing won second place in the 1995 Saloon of Youth.

In the 1998 Saloon of Youth, Zaher won the Grand Jury award and the International Critics Award (ICA) for his oil painting "Screaming in Quietness."

Other than the figure paintings, Zaher experimented with still life and landscape. These paintings and drawings usually featured unconventional compositions and colors. The oil paintings, much like his figuration paintings, are characterized by thick layers of impasto paint, something that gives the paintings a striking and powerful impact on the viewer.

== Paintings and subjects ==
Islam Zaher’s confidence for the essence of oil paint as an alive, tactile medium is said to lie at the core of his art practice. Obsessed with the expressive potential of color and paint skin, his work seeks to translate cerebral processes into raw, psychologically charged images.

On his "Intuited Happiness" series of paintings and drawings, Louise Sarant wrote: "Zaher depicts the schizophrenia that prevails in Egyptian society through a mixture of large paintings filled with bright colors and minimalistic drawings in various shades of brown...In one painting, a bride stands, small and dull in her fluffy white wedding dress, while the power of the celebration seems to crush her thin figure. The artist has stressed her state of dismay and anxiety by first drawing her in charcoal on textured paper and then scanning the figure and gluing her on the painting."

"Superficially expressionistic in style, Zaher’s semi-abstract paintings of objects such as furniture are fundamentally experiments in texture and color, creating a series of canvases teeming with tactile and visual surprises: the paint’s materiality, thickly layered, gives a sense of volumetric distinction to these objects as well as tonal complexities that reveal themselves the more you look at them."

— Ismail Fayed, writing on Islam Zaher in Mada Masr newspaper Cairo.
