= Minority stress =

Type of stress faced by minority groups

Minority stress describes high levels of stress faced by members of stigmatized minority groups. It may be caused by a number of factors, including poor social support and low socioeconomic status; well understood causes of minority stress are interpersonal prejudice and discrimination. Indeed, numerous scientific studies have shown that when minority individuals experience a high degree of prejudice, this can cause stress responses (e.g., high blood pressure, anxiety) that accrue over time, eventually leading to poor mental and physical health. Minority stress theory summarizes these scientific studies to explain how difficult social situations lead to chronic stress and poor health among minority individuals.

== Theoretical development ==
=== Emergence ===
Over the past three decades, social scientists have found that minority individuals suffer from mental and physical health disparities compared to their peers in majority groups. This research has focused primarily on racial and sexual minorities. For example, Black Americans have been found to suffer elevated rates of hypertension compared to whites. Lesbian, gay, bisexual, transgender and queer (LGBTQ+) individuals face higher rates of suicide, substance abuse, and cancer relative to non-queer people. More recent data suggest the association of minority stressors with higher rates of migraine headaches, stroke, and functional neurological disorder among LGBTQ+ people. Newer hypotheses propose that intersections of multiple minority stigmata increase experiences of stress. Researchers have also suggested that the LGBTQ+ community itself may be a source of minority stress for sexual minority men.

==== Social selection hypothesis ====
One causal explanation for minority health disparities is the social selection hypothesis, which holds that there is something inherent to being in a minority group (e.g., genetics) that makes individuals susceptible to health problems. In general, this view has not been supported by empirical research. Instead, research suggests that environmental factors explain minority health disparities better than do genetic factors. While the social selection hypothesis is still debated, it is clear that genetic and dispositional factors do not fully explain the health disparities observed in minority groups.

==== Social causation hypothesis ====
A second hypothesis regarding the causes of minority health disparities suggests that minority group members face difficult social situations that lead to poor health. This hypothesis has received broad empirical support. Indeed, social psychologists have long recognized that minority individuals have different social experiences compared to majority individuals, including prejudice and discrimination, unequal socioeconomic status, and limited access to health care. According to the social causation hypothesis, such difficult social experiences explain health differences between minority and majority individuals.

== Overview of minority stress theory ==
Minority stress theory extends the social causation hypothesis by suggesting that social situations do not lead directly to poor health for minority individuals, but that difficult social situations cause stress for minority individuals, which accrues over time, resulting in long-term health deficits.

When being applied to sexual and gender minorities, the term minority stress first appeared in the 1981 book Minority Stress in Lesbian Women by Virginia Rae Brooks, later known as Winn Kelly Brooks.

Minority Stress Theory, as it is currently referenced, was coined by Illan Meyer in his 1995 research study "Minority stress and mental health in gay men.". Meyer's version of minority stress theory distinguishes between distal and proximal stress processes. Distal stress processes are external to the minority individual, including experiences with rejection, prejudice, and discrimination. Proximal stress processes are internal, and are often the byproduct of distal stressors; they include concealment of one's minority identity, vigilance and anxiety about prejudice, and negative feelings about one's own minority group. Together, distal and proximal stressors accrue over time, leading to chronically high levels of stress that cause poor health outcomes. Thus, minority stress theory has three primary tenets:

1. Minority status leads to increased exposure to distal stressors.
2. Minority status leads to increased exposure to proximal stressors, due to distal stressors.
3. Minority individuals suffer adverse health outcomes, which are caused by exposure to proximal and distal stressors.

These three tenets of the minority stress theory have been tested in over 134 empirical studies, most of which examined racial and sexual minority populations. Generally, the studies have confirmed that difficult social situations are associated with stress among minority individuals, and that minority stress helps to explain health disparities.

== Evidence of key concepts ==
=== Minority status and distal stressors ===
The first tenet of minority stress theory holds that being in a minority group is associated with increased exposure to distal stressors, such as prejudice and discrimination. Indeed, despite significant improvement over the past several decades, numerous studies have confirmed that minority individuals continue to face high rates of distal stressors. For example, in large-scale national surveys, LGBTQ+ individuals report high rates of prejudice and discrimination across the lifespan. One survey found that one-fourth of LGBT adults have experienced victimization related to their sexual orientation, and another found that as many as 90% of LGBTQ+ youth report hearing prejudiced remarks at school. Similarly, up to 60% of African Americans report experiencing distal stressors throughout their lives, ranging from social rejection at school to housing discrimination and employment discrimination. In one study, 37 African American respondents recalled over 100 discrete experiences with racist prejudice in a two-year period. In another study, 98% of Black participants reported experiencing at least one incidence of prejudice in the past year.

Rates of exposure to distal stressors are much higher among racial and sexual minorities than among majority individuals. For example, LGBTQ+ adults are twice as likely to recall experiencing prejudice throughout their lives compared to heterosexuals, and LGBTQ+ youth report significantly higher rates of prejudice and discrimination compared to their heterosexual and cisgender peers. In one carefully controlled study, researchers compared rates of victimization among LGBTQ+ youth and their heterosexual siblings, and they found significantly higher rates of abuse among the LGBTQ+ individuals. Comparing rates of perceived discrimination among African American and White individuals, researchers have found large differences in reports of discrimination: 30.9% of Whites reported experiencing "major discrimination" throughout their lives compared to 48.9% of African Americans. Similarly, 3.4% of Whites reported experiencing discrimination "often" in their lives, compared to 24.8% of African Americans. Thus, collectively, research suggests that minority individuals face frequent exposure to distal stressors compared to their majority group counterparts.

=== Minority status and proximal stressors ===
Proximal stressors are internal processes that are presumed to occur following exposure to distal stressors. Examples of proximal stressors include fear of rejection, rumination on previous experiences with prejudice, and distaste for one's own minority group following a prejudice event. Most research on this topic focuses on either sexual minorities or African Americans, and it is unclear whether the proximal stress processes are conceptually similar between these two groups. Thus, it is necessary to review proximal stress processes separately for sexual minority and African American populations.

==== Proximal stressors among sexual minorities ====
A growing body of research indicates that exposure to distal stressors leads to proximal stressors in sexual minority populations. While sexual minority stress and gender minority stress both use Meyer's Minority Stress Model as a framework, and share some characteristics with gender minority stress, some researchers have suggested that sexual minority stress is distinct from the minority stress experienced by transgender, gender non-conforming, and non-binary-gender individuals. For example, LGBTQ+ youth and adults who have experienced prejudice about their sexual orientation sometimes choose to conceal their sexual identity from others. Concealing such personal information causes significant psychological distress, including intrusive thoughts about the secret, shame and guilt, anxiety, and isolation from other members of the minority group. Internalized homophobia is another proximal stressor prevalent among LGBT individuals. It refers to the internalization of negative social views about homosexuality, which leads to self-hatred and poor self-regard. As predicted by minority stress theory, internalized homophobia is associated with exposure to distal stressors, insofar as it only occurs because LGB individuals are exposed to negative societal attitudes toward same-sex attraction. Rejection sensitivity represents a third proximal stress among sexual minority individuals. Rejection sensitivity refers to chronic, anxious expectations of rejection based on one's stigmatized status. Among sexual minority individuals, rejection sensitivity emerges from experiences of rejection from parents and is associated with internalized homophobia, unassertiveness, depression, and anxiety. Thus, previous experiences with prejudice are associated with proximal stress among LGBTQ+ individuals, including concealment of their sexual identity, internalized homophobia, and rejection sensitivity.

==== Proximal stressors among gender minorities ====
In comparison to cis (non-transgender) individuals, gender variant minorities face a higher rate of distal stressors, including exclusion, verbal trans bashing, as well as physical and sexual violence. The more distal stressors are sourced in family, friends, partners, neighbors, co-workers, acquaintances, strangers, and even the police, the more likely it is for gender variant people to experience proximal stress, including internalized transphobia. Internalized transphobia may initially appear as anxiety and depression, marked by a severe decrease in self-tolerance or self-empathy, yet needs to be understood diagnostically within the context of minority stress.

==== Proximal stressors among African Americans ====
Among African Americans, proximal stressors were described by early social psychological theorists. For example, Erving Goffman observed that racial minorities approach social interactions with a high degree of anxiety, because they have been discriminated against in the past. Similarly, Gordon Allport asserted that African American individuals display vigilance after exposure to prejudice, actively scanning the social environment for potential threats. Such vigilance is presumed to be taxing, sapping emotional and cognitive energy from minority individuals and thus becoming stressful. Proximal stressors also have been demonstrated among African Americans in terms of stereotype threat. Researchers have shown that, when African Americans are reminded of their racial minority status in an academic context, they face a high degree of anxiety, causing their intellectual performance to suffer.

==== General proximal stressors among minority individuals ====
The proximal stress processes reviewed above are unique to specific minority groups; for example, internalized homophobia is a proximal stressor unique to LGBTQ+ individuals who experience prejudice about their sexual and or/gender orientation/expression, and vigilance against racism is unique to racial minorities who fear future experiences with race-based discrimination. It is also possible that more general psychological processes act as proximal stressors for minority individuals. For example, exposure to prejudice may lead to rumination, which is a common psychological phenomenon characterized by a maladaptive, repetitive, and obsessive focus on a past event that leads to depressive and anxious symptoms. Several studies have shown that distal stressors are associated with such general proximal stress processes among minority individuals. In one 2010 longitudinal study, researchers found that gay men who experienced distal stressors related to their sexual orientation had an increased tendency to ruminate, which was associated with increased depressive and anxious symptoms compared to gay men who did not experience distal stressors. In another study from 2009, LGBT youth reported higher rates of rumination on days when they experienced distal stressors; rumination in turn was associated with psychological distress. Because minority individuals have been shown to face high rates of distal stressors compared to majority individuals, and because experiencing distal stressors is associated with general psychological stress processes such as rumination and anxiety, these findings highlight the more general ways in which prejudice and discrimination may affect internal stress processes among minority individuals.

=== Health outcomes ===
The bulk of minority stress research has examined the third tenet of the theory – namely, that distal and proximal stressors are associated with adverse health outcomes for minority individuals. These outcomes include both mental and physical health disparities, which differ across minority groups. Again, studies have yet to systematically determine whether minority stress is associated with different health outcomes among different minority groups. Thus, it is necessary to review associations between minority stress and health separately for LGBTQ+, African Americans, and immigrant groups, as social scientists do not know whether stress causes similar outcomes across groups. The immigrant paradox outlines health outcomes among immigrant populations.

==== Health outcomes among sexual minorities ====
LGBTQ+ individuals face higher rates of psychopathology compared to their non-LGBTQ+ peers. For example, population-based studies have shown that LGBTQ+ people are at risk for increased rates of substance abuse, suicide attempts, depression, anxiety, and somatoform disorders across the lifespan. In fact, one meta analysis found that LGBT individuals are 2.5 times more likely to have a lifetime history of mental disorder compared to heterosexuals, and 2 times more likely to have a current mental disorder. In terms of physical health, LGBTQ+ individuals are at heightened risks for some types of cancer and immune dysfunction.

Several studies have linked these negative health outcomes to distal stressors. For example, in a national survey, LGBT adults displayed higher rates of psychiatric morbidity and also reported significantly higher rates of prejudice and discrimination compared to their heterosexual peers; prejudice and discrimination fully explained the link between sexual orientation and psychiatric symptoms for LGBT respondents. In another study, level of peer victimization partially explained associations between sexual orientation and suicide risk. Perceived level of discrimination has also been shown to predict anxiety and substance abuse disorders among LGBTQ+ individuals. Multiple studies have also established an association between same-sex marriage legalization and reduced suicidality of youth and adolescents, indicating that the structural stigma embedded in denying equivalent rights to sexual minorities mediates part of the relationship between distal stressors and mental health.

Proximal stressors have also been linked to negative health outcomes for sexual minorities. For example, internalized homophobia has been linked to self-harm and eating disorders as well as sexual risk-taking behavior. Internalized homophobia has also been linked to general psychological distress, which predicts long-term mental health outcomes. Another example is pathologization of asexuality possibly being linked with suicidality among asexual people. Thus, both distal and proximal social stressors are associated with negative mental health outcomes among sexual minorities. A 2013 study suggests similar links between proximal stressors and physical health disparities in LGBTQ+ communities, including cardiovascular disease, asthma, diabetes, and some cancers. More recently, gender dysphoria has been suggested to represent a proximal minority stressor.

==== Health outcomes among African Americans ====
African Americans have been shown to suffer notable health disparities compared to their White peers. For example, they suffer higher rates of morbidity due to stroke, perinatal disease, and diabetes mellitus compared to Whites. They also suffer high rates of colorectal, pancreatic, and stomach cancers. In terms of mental health, African Americans report lower rates of overall life satisfaction, as well as heightened depressive symptoms and substance abuse compared to Whites.

Distal stressors have been linked to these health disparities among African Americans. For example, one study showed that perceived prejudice was associated with irregular blood pressure throughout the day, which has been linked to long-term cardiovascular disease. Exposure to racial prejudice has also been linked to negative health behaviors, such as smoking and substance abuse, which are associated with poor cardiovascular health. Indeed, a 2009 meta analysis of 36 empirical studies revealed consistent effects of prejudice and discrimination on physical health (e.g., cardiovascular disease, hypertension, diabetes) among racial minorities. That same review revealed that racial prejudice and discrimination were related to depressive symptoms and psychiatric distress in 110 empirical studies. Individual studies have shown that reports of discrimination are associated with lower reports of happiness and life satisfaction, higher psychiatric distress, and depressive symptoms. Thus, exposure to distal stressors has been linked to poor mental and physical health outcomes for African Americans.

Other studies have linked proximal stressors and health outcomes for African Americans. For example, researchers have found that African Americans have a sense of inferiority and low self-worth due to experiences with prejudice, which are associated with emotional distress. Similarly, internalized racism has been linked to psychiatric symptoms, including high rates of alcohol consumption, low self-esteem, and depression. These findings corroborate the minority stress theory by demonstrating that proximal stressors are associated with health disparities among racial minorities. Non-Hispanic Whites are more than twice as likely to receive antidepressant prescription treatments as are Non-Hispanic Blacks. The death rate from suicide for African American men was almost four times that for African American women, in 2009. However, the suicide rate for African Americans is 60% lower than that of the Non-Hispanic White population. A report from the U.S. Surgeon General found that from 1980 - 1995, the suicide rate among African Americans ages 10 to 14 increased 233%, as compared to 120% of Non-Hispanic Whites.

== Criticism and limitations ==
Despite multiple studies indicating that minority individuals face a high degree of stress related to their minority identity, and that minority stress is associated with poor health outcomes, there are several methodological limitations and ongoing debates on this topic.

First, the minority stress concept has been criticized as focusing too narrowly on the negative experiences of minority individuals and ignoring the unique coping strategies and social support structures available to them. While theoretical writings about minority stress do note the importance of coping mechanisms for minority individuals, individual studies that use minority stress theory tend to focus on negative health outcomes rather than on coping mechanisms. In the future, it will be important for researchers to consider both positive and negative aspects of minority group membership, examining whether and why one of those aspects outweighs the other in determining minority health outcomes.

Also, few studies have been able to test minority stress theory in full. Most studies have examined one of the three links described above, demonstrating that minority individuals face heightened rates of prejudice, that minority individuals face health disparities, or that prejudice is related to health disparities. Together, findings from these three areas corroborate minority stress theory, but a stronger test would examine all three parts in the same study. While there have been a few such studies, further replication is necessary to support the presumed pathways underlying minority stress.

Most studies of minority stress are correlational. While these studies have the advantage of using large, national datasets to establish links between minority status, stressors, and health, they cannot demonstrate causality. That is, most of the existing research cannot prove that prejudice causes stress, which causes poor health outcomes among minority individuals, because correlation does not imply causation. One way to remedy this limitation is to employ experimental and longitudinal research designs to test the impact of social stressors on health. Indeed, several studies from the 2000s made use of these more stringent tests of minority stress. Additional studies are needed to confidently state that prejudice causes poor health for minority individuals.

It is unclear whether different minority groups face different types of minority stress and different health outcomes following prejudice. Minority stress theory was originally developed to explain associations between social situations, stress, and health for LGB individuals. Still, researchers have used the same general theory to examine stress processes among African Americans, and findings have generally converged with those from LGB populations. Thus, it is possible that minority stress applies broadly to members of diverse minority groups. However, studies have yet to directly compare experiences, stress responses, and health outcomes among individuals from diverse minority groups. Systematic comparisons are necessary to clarify whether minority stress applies to all minority individuals broadly, or whether different models are required for different groups.

J. Michael Bailey has argued that the minority stress model fails to take several confounders into account, including temperament and genetics. Bailey argues that there is a biological and temperamental component to increased stress among sexual minority populations, writing "it would be a shame—most of all for gay men and lesbians whose mental health is at stake—if sociopolitical concerns prevented researchers from conscientious consideration of any reasonable hypothesis". Meyer et al. published a critique of this argument.

== Practical applications ==
Minority stress research has demonstrated that several specific processes are associated with minority health disparities. For example, existing studies highlight the differences between distal and proximal stressors, drawing attention both to socio-cultural factors (e.g., high rates of prejudice against minority individuals) and internal processes (e.g., rumination) that affect minority well-being. By separating the socio-cultural and individual aspects of minority stress, the theory suggests that practical interventions must occur at both the individual and social levels.

=== Social applications ===
On the societal level, minority stress research shows that prejudice and discrimination are common occurrences for minority individuals, and that they have damaging effects for individual well-being. This information has been used by law enforcement, policymakers, and social organizations to target and minimize the occurrence of distal stressors and, thus, to improve minority health on a large scale. For example, evidence that prejudice is associated with minority stress has been used in several amicus curiae briefs to settle important court cases regarding prejudice and discrimination against minority groups. Evidence that prejudice and discrimination are associated with minority stress that harms well-being for LGBT individuals has also been invoked in the congressional debate about anti-harassment protection for LGBT youth at the federal level. In the future, the minority stress concept can be used to advocate for federal funding for nationwide campaigns and interventions that aim to reduce intergroup prejudice. If successful, these programs may reduce the rate of distal stressors, significantly improving the mental and physical health of minority individuals.

=== Individual applications ===
On the individual level, minority stress research has uncovered differences in how minorities react to prejudice. For example, studies have shown that some individuals ruminate on experiences with prejudice, which is associated with anxiety and depression. Similarly, minority stress research has revealed that internalized stigma (i.e., distaste for one's own minority group) is associated with negative psychological outcomes. From these findings, clinicians have developed some interventions to decrease internalized stigma and improve well-being for minority individuals. When paired with structural interventions, these clinical applications for reducing minority stress may help to improve the pervasive health disparities observed in minority communities.

== See also ==
- Alter ego
- Antisemitism in health care
- Center for Minority Health
- Closeted
- Community Health
- Driving while black
- Ego-dystonic sexual orientation
- Flying while Muslim
- He never married
- Health equity
- Homosexuality and psychology
- Hopkins Center for Health Disparities Solutions
- Category:Indigenous health
- Inequality in disease
- Intergroup anxiety
- Internalized oppression
  - Internalized ableism
  - Internalized racism
  - Internalized sexism
  - Self-hating Jew
- John Henryism
- Masking (behavior)
- Mental health of LGBTQ people
- Microaggression
- Model minority
- Overachievement
- Passing
- Perry v. Schwarzenegger
- Population health
- Pronoun game
- Race and health
- Race-based traumatic stress
- Racial profiling
- Racial trauma
- Shibboleth
- Slavery hypertension hypothesis
- Social determinants of health
- Social epidemiology
- Social exclusion
- Social invisibility
- Stigma management
- Stress (psychological)
- Suicide among LGBTQ youth
- The talk (racism in the United States)
- Transgenerational trauma
- Weathering hypothesis
