= Racial trauma =

Cumulative effects of racism on health

Racial trauma, or race-based traumatic stress, is the cumulative effects of racism on an individual’s mental and physical health. It has been observed in numerous BIPOC communities and people of all ages, including young children. Racial trauma can be experienced vicariously or directly. It has been linked to feelings of anxiety, depression, and suicidal ideation, as well as other physical health issues.

== Causes of Racial Trauma ==
When an individual experiences racism, they can develop racial trauma. Racial trauma can be caused by racial discrimination and/or racial harassment. Racial discrimination is a term used to describe attitudes, actions, or policies that function to (1) keep physical distance between racially privileged groups and racially underprivileged groups (e.g., a white person crossing the road when they see a person of color walking in their direction at night) and/or (2) ensure that people with minoritized racial identities remain in the less privileged margins of society (e.g., education redlining excluding students of color from better-funded public schools). Racial harassment is a term used to describe attitudes, actions, or policies that function to forcibly subjugate people with marginalized racial identities to positions of inferiority; racial harassment often (either explicitly or implicitly) communicates antagonism and/or violence against people with marginalized racial identities (e.g., racially motivated hate crimes).

Racial trauma can be caused by one acute experience of racism (e.g., sexual and racial harassment in the workplace) or by numerous, more subtle forms of racism that accumulate over time (e.g., racial microaggressions). Racial trauma can also be caused by both experiences of overt racism and covert racism. Overt racism describes instances of racism that occur on a person-to-person basis; it is the form of racism that people are more used to labeling as “racist” (e.g., one person yells racial slurs at another person). Covert racism occurs on a policy, institution, and/or society level; it is often more difficult for people to identify covert racism (e.g., high school students only being taught a European account of history in a history class).

Racial trauma responses are also evoked by vicarious racism. Vicarious racism occurs when a person from a marginalized racial group somehow witnesses other people of their race experience and/or become negatively impacted by racism (e.g., a person witnessing their mother being called racial slurs). It can also be caused by racial intergenerational trauma, which is defined as trauma resulting from racism that is passed from one generation of the family to the next generation (e.g., the trauma a parent experiences because of racism negatively impacts the parent’s quality of parenting).

== Consequences of and Outcomes Associated with Racial Trauma ==
People experiencing racial trauma may suffer from a wide variety of psychological and/or physiological symptoms. Psychological symptoms include intrusive thoughts, social withdrawal, hypervigilance, low self-worth, worry, and depression. Physical and somatic symptoms include headaches and sleep disturbances.

Symptoms of racial trauma can arise at any age, but the symptoms of racial trauma seem to differ across the lifespan. A 2020 study by Saleem and colleagues have created a model which suggests that children experience different symptoms of racial trauma depending on their stage of development. Preschool and elementary school children experience fear for the safety of themselves and their caregivers. Middle school children can begin to develop negative beliefs about their racial groups and start to feel hopeless and/or numb when they witness racially motivated violence in the media. Teenagers may experience symptoms like adults, but the magnitude of the symptoms are likely greater in teens; this greater intensity may be due to the importance of social inclusion during this developmental stage.

== Arguments for Conceptualizing Racial Trauma as PTSD ==
Racial trauma is not included in the most recent edition of the Diagnostic and Statistical Manual of Mental Disorders (DSM), since it does not meet the current criteria. However, researchers such as Robert T. Carter, Thema Bryant-Davis, and Carlota Ocampo have lobbied for its addition. According to them, racial trauma evokes symptoms similar to that of post-traumatic stress disorder (PTSD), hence the push for its recognition as a viable mental health concern. The effects race-based traumatic stress have on individuals depend on their experiences, and the ways in which it can manifest itself can vary significantly as well. Individuals who are exposed to race-based trauma or stress may experience dissociative symptoms following the event. Dissociative symptoms include depersonalization, in which an individual feels disconnected from their body or mind, and derealization, in which an individual has unreal or distorted sense of experiences.

== Arguments Against Labeling Racial Trauma as a Mental Illness ==
While there are some researchers who assert that it is important to understand racial trauma in the context of PTSD, other scientists warn against the consequences of pigeonholing experiences of racial trauma into a PTSD framework. One of the concerns voiced by people who hold this position is that many people who suffer from symptoms after experiencing racial trauma would not meet diagnostic criteria for PTSD. Racial trauma only has potential to become a diagnosable form of PTSD when it is caused by racial harassment in which the person of color (1) perceived or experienced their life to be in danger (2) believed or were physically harmed, or (3) discerned a threat of or suffered from sexual violence. (Some examples of this kind of racial trauma include police brutality against African Americans and hate crimes committed against Asian Americans after the COVID 19 pandemic outbreak.) Some people worry that not meeting diagnostic criteria for PTSD would invalidate people’s experiences of racial trauma—potentially further exacerbating feelings of invisibility among racially marginalized groups.

Another concern among people who are hesitant to label racial trauma as some form of mental illness is that diagnoses using the DSM-V may incorrectly convey that such a diagnosis exists within the individual—rather than results from systemic shortcomings. It can also leave people who suffer from racial trauma symptoms prone to experiencing both external and internalized stigma regarding mental illness.

== Variations among Racial Groups ==
People of color experience different sources of social and institutional stress in their daily lives. Racism contributes significantly to trauma and emotional abusiveness in this group of people. Understanding of racial trauma and the effects of racism is critical to mitigate mental distress and lessen negative effects for ethnic minorities.

While many symptoms of racial trauma (e.g., hypervigilance, hopelessness, etc.) and oppressive experiences that trigger such trauma responses (e.g., poverty, violence in the community, etc.), there are some notable differences among racial groups. Racism manifests in different ways for each racial group. As a result of this, it seems that people who are part of different racial communities become more triggered by certain forms of racism that are more salient in their lived experiences—and that the responses to those triggers (e.g., “symptoms” of racial trauma) are more prevalent in those racial groups. Research mentions anti-immigrant policies (e.g., crimmigration) and attitudes (e.g., nativism) as a prominent activator of racial trauma symptoms in the Latin immigrant community; one of the common symptoms that results from these experiences is a fear of deportation. A prominent form of racism in America is policy shootings and police brutality against members of the African American community; these shooting evoke a fear of law enforcement among this community’s members. The Native American community suffers from more substance use problems than any other racial community; members who suffer from these problems mention current racism (e.g., disregard for native land treaties) as a contributor to the problems and an obstacle to recovering. Japanese Americans struggled with acute (e.g., loss of their homes and property, etc.) and long-term (e.g., feelings of betrayal, humiliation, inferiority, etc.) effects of their community’s incarceration after the bombing of Pearl Harbor. These are just a few examples of how experiences and consequences of racial trauma differ among racial groups because of the various forms of oppression that exist in society.

== Resilience and Healing from Racial Trauma ==
Taking a more general approach (rather than tailoring to a specific racial group), there are a few things that can promote healing from racial trauma. Developing a strong sense of one’s cultural identity, engaging with social support, and communicating the consequences of racism have all seemed to foster healing from racial trauma.

Many methods for healing from racial trauma were created for specific racial groups who are considered particularly vulnerable to experiencing such trauma. Two examples of specific frameworks were created for Latinx immigrant and Africana communities. Chavez and colleagues created a healing framework for Latinx immigrants called the HEART framework. The HEART framework consists of four phases: (1) developing a “sanctuary” in which Latinx immigrants feel validated and their immediate concerns or problems are addressed (2) implementing treatments supported by research while also contextualizing Latinx immigrants’ experiences of racial trauma (3) instilling racial pride and increase Latinx immigrants’ sense of connection to Latinx culture (4) encouraging resistance of oppression through engagements with social justice. Chioneso and colleagues created a healing framework for Africana communities called C-HeARTS. C-HeARTS centers justice to promote personal, interpersonal, and systemic well-being in Africana communities. The framework also encourages culturally congruent means of making sense of and healing from racial trauma; such means include storytelling and resisting sociopolitical oppression.

Researchers have also emphasized the importance of framing resilience and healing not only from an individualistic—but also a community and societal perspective. Viewing resilience collectively not only better aligns with some communities who suffer more often from racial trauma—but also enables a lens in which healing from trauma can be contextualized as work that must be done on a systemic level too.
