= Race-based traumatic stress =

Traumatic response to stress following a racial encounter

Race-based traumatic stress is the traumatic response to stress following a racial encounter. Robert T. Carter's (2007) theory of race-based traumatic stress implies that there are individuals of color who experience racial discrimination as traumatic, and often generate responses similar to post-traumatic stress. Race-based traumatic stress combines theories of stress, trauma and race-based discrimination to describe a particular response to negative racial encounters.

Despite the limited research that examines race-based traumatic stress specifically, trauma research suggests that an individual's response to a stressor is highly dependent on that person's perception of the stressor; what one person may experience as traumatic, another person may not experience as such. These differing responses have been found to be strongly associated with each individual's ability to cope with the said stressor. According to Carter, a professor at Columbia University, race-based traumatic stress is an individual's response to racial discrimination as traumatic or outside of their ability to cope. Race-based traumatic stress can be experienced both directly and indirectly and can occur on an interpersonal level, institutional level, or cultural level. As such, research indicates that race-based traumatic stress can be demonstrated as a number of negative outcomes, including psychopathological symptoms, social inequities, and internalized racial oppression.

Research has indicated that children, as well as adults, can experience and be impacted by the reaches of race-based traumatic stress. Through direct experience from peers and/or authority figures, as well as indirectly through media exposure and/or bearing witness to the racial discrimination of their parents, research suggests children of color are particularly vulnerable to race-based traumatic stress.

== Effects ==
Despite the popular understanding that race is a socially-based construct, research indicates that it has critical social implications and plays a role in the way individuals navigate society. Race-based traumatic stress is viewed as a consequence of racially motivated discrimination, exclusion, and unjust treatment. Racial discrimination can be interpersonal, institutional/structural, and/or cultural. At the interpersonal level, race-based traumatic stress occurs when an individual directly experiences race-based prejudice from another person. Institutional racial discrimination occurs at the hands of trusted or imperative social structures of power in society that for example, may withhold services or resources from people of color. Lastly, on a cultural level, racial discrimination occurs when non-Eurocentric cultures are devalued or viewed as inferior.

Additionally, research indicates that racial discrimination can be experienced both overtly and covertly. On an overt level, people of color are targeted in an intentionally blatant manner due to their racial identities. In contrast, covert racial discrimination, often termed microaggressions, often come in the form of subtle messages, whether intentional or not, and demonstrate malicious, invalidating, or disparaging meaning for people of color. With the frequency at which race-based discrimination is found to occur, on both overt and covert levels, some individuals may experience re-traumatization.

== Models ==
The Race-Based Traumatic Stress Model (RBTSM) is a model which outlines the different emotional responses individuals have following race-based encounters. Despite being linked to a variety of outcomes including psychopathology, Carter (2007) believes this response is more of an emotional injury than a pathological one. The model emphasizes Carter's distinction between two forms of racism: discrimination and harassment. It follows that discrimination-based racism is linked to hyperarousal and hypervigilance while consequences of harassment-based racism, such as complex emotional reactions, tend to have a long-lasting impact.

=== Outcomes ===
Research indicates that different forms of racial discrimination, such as interpersonal, institutional, and cultural are often associated with specific types of outcomes in people of color. Interpersonal racial discrimination, for example, has been found to have more of an effect at the individual level, often demonstrated in mental health symptoms such as trauma, anxiety, depression, stress, and even physiological symptoms such as hypertension. Racial discrimination at the institutional level has been found to result in social inequities for people of color such as higher rates of incarceration, health disparities, and educational difficulties. Cultural racial discrimination has been found to be associated with internalized racism, often resulting in individuals devaluing their own culture in ways such as denouncing their cultural heritage and values and/or internalizing negative stereotypical beliefs associated with their own racial group. Additionally, research indicates that the internalization of racial oppression can lead to feelings of shame and malice. However, the experience of racial discrimination is complex and its various forms often overlap and lead to a number of psychological, social, and physiological outcomes.

== Children ==
Children are particularly vulnerable to the detrimental effects of race-based traumatic stress, as research indicates that oftentimes they lack the coping strategies needed to overcome these experiences. Research indicates that children can be affected by these stressors both indirectly and directly, through experiences with racially charged interactions or through intergenerational transmission. Racial victimization can result in cross-generational trauma; where children can witness their caregivers either experience race-based discrimination or children can experience the effects of the race-based discrimination for their caregivers. Caregiver's experience of race-based traumatic stress can be displayed in actions such as increased substance use, an increase in delinquency or violence which can lead to incarceration, and mental health difficulties which can impair attachment and parenting strategies. Research suggests that the stressors associated with racial discrimination are chronic and impact multiple areas of development for children such as cognitive, biological and psychosocial.

Research implies that children can experience race-based stressors in the form of bullying through verbal comments about their racial identity, physically in the form of violence, or interpersonally, through acts against them such as being excluded from activities. Children can experience verbal attacks that can include teasing concerning distinct aspects of their identity such as physical appearance, beliefs, cultural aspects, accents, language barriers, and acculturation levels. In addition to experiences with peers, children can be targeted by negative interactions with authority figures such as teachers or school staff questioning their capabilities or making verbalizations discouraging their goals.

=== Outcomes ===
Given that children have limited coping strategies and cognitive resources to deal with race-based discrimination, research suggests that these experiences can be internalized as traumatic and associated with the development of mental health disorders such as post-traumatic stress disorder (PTSD). In addition, it is indicated that discrimination experienced in childhood may lead to low self-esteem, difficulties with academic performance, and increased externalizing behaviors such as acting out, defiance, anger, mistrust, and internalizing behaviors such as depression or anxiety.

Furthermore, recent findings suggest that children who experience race-based discrimination from peers have increased difficulty with establishing a confident personality, as social interactions and social categories affect their self-esteem and overall self-view. Peer interactions and establishing a social self is an aspect of development that is significant during childhood, therefore experiences with peers can have a significant impact. Getting negative verbalization from either peers or authority figures can lead to internalization of the stereotypes and beliefs about their own race and can lead to difficulties with accepting oneself and adopting beliefs that they are not capable of accomplishing goals. Research suggests that these experiences can impact their self-esteem and overall worldview.

== Assessment ==
The lack of research on race-based traumatic stress is in part due to the fact that it is difficult to recognize or assess because there is no clear link associated with experiencing racial discrimination and the development of psychological difficulties in response to the racial encounter. Currently, no diagnoses account for trauma associated with race-based interactions and experiences, and limited assessments accurately assess for experiences of racial discrimination. The Race-Based Traumatic Stress Symptom Scale (RBTSSS) is an assessment that has been developed in order to address this lack of appropriate assessments. The RBTSSS utilizes open-ended questions related to three experiences of racism that each individual has encountered. Individuals are then prompted to identify whether the experience was emotionally painful, sudden, and not in their control. Individuals choose one of these experiences and address questions related to feelings after the event, which fall within the following subscales: Anger, Depression, Intrusion, Hypervigilance, Physical, Low self-esteem, and Avoidance. Use of tools such as the RBTSSS is recommended in order to address distress associated with race-based traumatic stress.

== Treatment ==
The little research on race-based traumatic stress suggests that treatment can focus on the symptoms associated with the experiences such as hyperarousal, low self-esteem, hyper vigilance, substance use, and engagement in risky-behavior. Furthermore, highlighting protective factors, such as support from friends and family, positive outlook, and engagement in extracurricular activities can increase feelings of being included in the community. Research suggests that future goals for improved treatment of race-based traumatic stress can include specialized training for mental health professionals to increase the professional's capabilities of having discussions about race and discrimination and exploring the impact on each individual's life. Furthermore, research indicates that in addition to addressing the common symptoms associated with mental health disorders, clinicians can focus on exploring and addressing the direct impact of race-based traumatic stress.

While seeking treatment from a mental health professional is an option, other research highlights racial socialization which is a concept that can be used by individuals to teach their children to cope with race-based stress. This concept pertains to parents having discussions with their children outside of therapy about situations where they may encounter discrimination due to their race. The goal of these discussions is to build the child's skills that will help them approach the discriminatory experiences they may face in the future.

== See also ==
- Minority stress
