= Autistic burnout =

Chronic exhaustion in autistic people

Autistic burnout describes prolonged periods of debilitation experienced by some autistic people. Research suggests that it results from exhaustion caused by attempts to camouflage autistic characteristics, overcompensating for feelings of being ashamed of responses to chronic life stress. Symptoms include difficulties with thinking and communication alongside increased sensitivity to sensory and social demands. The symptoms may extend to the entirety of a person's life.

== Signs and symptoms ==
Autistic burnout is a state of severe mental and physical exhaustion accompanied by reduced functioning and a lower tolerance of sensory demands. It can affect several areas of life at once, including work, education, relationships, and everyday activities.

Reported reductions in functioning include difficulties with decision-making, memory, speech, emotional self-regulation, and everyday tasks such as self-care. Previously tolerable sensory experiences may become more difficult to manage. Other reported features include interpersonal withdrawal, reduced affect display, and a decreased ability to camouflage autistic characteristics. In many individuals this leads to suicidal ideation.

Autistic burnout can be cyclical in nature, often recurring from adolescence onwards and worsening in severity with age and increases in life demands unless the underlying causes are addressed.

== Causes ==
Autistic burnout is often interpreted as caused by camouflaging (also known as autistic masking), an attempt to conceal autistic character traits to navigate social expectations. This behaviour can serve as a strategy for social inclusion, but also depletes a person's resources. Reducing it ('unmasking') can bring relief, but may also expose people to stigma, exclusion, and psychological trauma in environments that do not accept autistic characteristics. This may create a double bind: autistic people camouflage to avoid stigma, victimization, and discrimination in non-autistic settings, concealing their needs in the process, but the effort involved can deplete their resources and contribute to exhaustion and burnout.

One proposed explanation describes a cycle in which exhaustion reduces a person's ability to camouflage, making their autistic characteristics more visible. This increased visibility may expose them to further discrimination and stigma, adding to the pressures associated with burnout.

Difficulties recognizing internal signs of exhaustion may make it harder for some autistic people to notice accumulating stress. Alexithymia, which involves difficulties identifying and describing emotions, has been proposed as a contributing factor.

== Management ==
Treatment and avoidance of burnout focuses on the social model of disability. The literature emphasizes adjustments to sensory environments, reasonable accommodation, and increased acceptance and inclusion to reduce the sense of stigma or shame. Creating safer and more accepting environments can reduce pressure to camouflage.

Recommendations for communication during autistic distress include reducing communicative demands, using augmentative and alternative communication, and providing a calm environment.

== History ==
The term autistic burnout originally appeared in autistic online communities. A study led by Dora Raymaker in 2020 was the first attempt at a scientific definition of autistic burnout. Her team used community-based participatory research to analyse interviews and public Internet accounts to characterize the experience.

Autistic burnout remains an emerging area of study. Researchers are considering whether it can be defined as a syndrome, means of diagnosis and measurement, and its relationship with depression and occupational burnout.
