= Transgenerational trauma =

Psychological trauma

Transgenerational trauma, intergenerational trauma, or generational trauma is the psychological and physiological effects that the trauma experienced by people has on subsequent generations in that group. The primary mode of transmission is the shared family environment of the infant, causing psychological, behavioral and social changes in the individual.

Collective trauma is when psychological trauma experienced by communities and identity groups is carried on as part of the group's collective memory and shared sense of identity. As an example, the Indigenous Peoples of Canada experienced it within the Canadian Indian residential school system. African Americans who were enslaved is another. When this collective trauma affects subsequent generations, it is called transgenerational trauma. For example, when Jewish people, who are born into a later generation, learn about the Holocaust (presumably from older family members), and then experience extreme stress or practice survivalism out of fear of another Holocaust.

Transgenerational trauma can be a collective experience that affects groups of people who share a cultural identity (e.g., ethnicity, nationality, or religious identity). It can also be applied to single families or individual parent–child dyads. For example, survivors of individual child abuse and both direct survivors of the collective trauma and members of subsequent generations individually may develop complex post-traumatic stress disorder.

Examples of this include collective trauma experienced by descendants of the Atlantic slave trade; segregation and Jim Crow laws in the United States; apartheid in South Africa; the Scramble for Africa, Armenian genocide survivors, Jewish Holocaust survivors and other members of the Jewish community at the time; Bosnian war survivors; by the First Peoples of Canada within the Canadian Indian residential school system; by Native Americans when they were forcibly displaced and removed from their land; and, in Australia, the Stolen Generations and other hardships inflicted on Aboriginal and Torres Strait Islander peoples.

While transgenerational trauma gained attention in recent decades, the hypothesis of an epigenetic mechanism remains controversial due to a lack of rigorous experimental results on humans.

== History ==
This field of research is relatively young, but was expanded in the mid-to-late-2000s. Intergenerational trauma was first recognized in the children of Holocaust survivors. In 1966, psychologists began to observe large numbers of children of Holocaust survivors seeking mental help in clinics in Canada. The grandchildren of Holocaust survivors were overrepresented by 300% among the referrals to a psychiatry clinic in comparison with their representation in the general population. Since then, transgenerational trauma has been noted amongst descendants of African-Americans forced into slavery, Native American genocide survivors, war survivors, refugees, survivors of domestic violence, and many other groups that have experienced collective distress.

Research on possible biological mechanisms for inheritance of trauma began in the late 1990s. It has been suggested that traumatic stress can be passed down to future generations via epigenetics. However, the effect is difficult to separate from environmental and cultural transmission and conclusive evidence that it occurs in humans has yet to be found.

Although methylation of stress-related genes in humans may affect development, there is no evidence that these changes in humans are passed on to subsequent generations. Methylation is normally erased when an egg cell is fertilized.

== Definitions and description ==
Transgenerational trauma is a collective experience that affects groups of people because of their cultural identity (e.g., ethnicity, nationality, or religious identity). Because of its collective nature, the term is not usually applied to single families or individual parent–child dyads. However, like survivors of individual child abuse, individually, both direct survivors of the collective trauma and members of subsequent generations may develop complex post-traumatic stress disorder.

Trauma may be transmitted socially (e.g., through learned behaviors) or through the effects of stress on development before birth (inc. increased smoking/alcohol use).

=== Historical trauma ===
Historical trauma, a sub-type of transgenerational trauma, is the collective devastation of the past that continues to affect populations in the present through inter-generational transmission. Historical trauma results in vulnerability to mental and physical health problems due to ancestral suffering which has been collected throughout generations into "legacies of disability for contemporary descendants". Although the actual traumatic event and affect group(s) are heterogeneous, all historical traumas consist of three elements: a traumatic event, a resulting collective suffering, and a multigenerational impact of that trauma. Over time the trauma and relationship to the victims typically evolve in a similar but more complicated way to genetic anticipation, resulting in a greater loss of identity of the victims and further integration into society.

For individual victims, historical trauma often manifests in four ways: depression, hyper-vigilance, traumatic bond formation, and reenactment of the trauma. Building upon the clinical observations by Selma Fraiberg, child trauma researchers such as Byron Egeland, Inge Bretherton, and Daniel Schechter have empirically identified psychological mechanisms that favor intergenerational transmission, including dissociation in the context of attachment, and "communication" of prior traumatic experience as an effect of parental efforts to maintain self-regulation in the context of post-traumatic stress disorder and related alterations in social cognitive processes.

== Symptoms ==
Symptoms of intergenerational trauma always begins with the survivor of a trauma, which tend to manifest as symptoms of PTSD. Oftentimes trauma in the second generation is deemed as a traumatic response to parental trauma. Transmission between the parent and child can be broken down into five measures: communication, conflict, family cohesion, parental warmth, and parental involvement. High levels of maternal stress were directly correlated with weak family functioning and indirectly correlated with deviant behavior among children. Common symptoms in children consisted of depression, antisocial behavior, delinquency, and disruptive behavior in school. Some children experienced direct transmission in which their trauma stemmed from the interactions and relationships with their parents, while others experienced indirect transmission in which their trauma was mainly rooted in guilt. Those who were affected through direct transmission were more likely to lash out through their actions, while those who were affected through indirect transmission were more likely to develop depression, anxiety, and guilt.

Symptoms also differed based on ethnicity and type of original trauma. Enslavement, genocide, domestic violence, sexual abuse, and extreme poverty are all common sources of trauma that lead to intergenerational trauma. A lack of therapy also worsens symptoms and can lead to transmission. For instance, survivors of child sexual abuse may negatively influence future generations due to their past unresolved trauma. This can lead to increased feelings of mistrust, isolation, and loneliness. Descendants of enslaved persons when faced with racism-motivated violence, microaggressions, or outward racism, react as if they were faced with the original trauma that was generationally transmitted to them. There are a variety of stressors in one's life that led to this PTSD-like reaction such as varying racist experiences, daily stressors, major race-related life events, or collective racism or traumas. This also presents itself in parenting styles. Goodman and West-Olatunji proposed potential transgenerational trauma in the aftermath of natural disasters. In a post-Hurricane Katrina New Orleans, residents have seen a dramatic increase in interpersonal violence with higher mortality rates. This phenomenon has been also been reported in the descendants of Indigenous students at residential schools, who were removed from their parents and extended family and lacked models for parenting as a result. Being punished for speaking their native language and forbidden from practicing traditional rituals had a traumatic effect on many students, and child abuse was rampant in the schools as well.

Symptoms of transgenerational trauma have in recent years been identified among black Americans, in relation to the effects of slavery and racial discrimination. This passing of trauma can be rooted from the family unit itself, or found in society via current discrimination and oppression. The traumatic event does not need to be individually experienced by all members of a family; the lasting effects can still remain and impact descendants from external factors. For example, black children's internalization of others' reactions to their skin color manifests as a form of lasting trauma originally experienced by their ancestors. This reaction to black skin stems from similar attitudes that led to the traumatizing conditions and enslavement of slaves. Black children and youth are more susceptible to racial trauma because they have not yet acquired the knowledge to have a full understanding of racism and its effects. However, these traumatizing behaviors experienced at such a young age are a reflection of a child's parenting. A White child may learn racist behaviors from their environment, but by the same token a black child can learn to assert their blackness and how to respond to racist remarks and actions from their parents. Traces of trauma have an impact on black and other minority children's success in an educational context. Transgenerational trauma has also been heavily recorded in refugees and their children, which can last through several generations. Such traumas can stem from violence, political persecution, familial instability, as well as the hardships of migration.

== Affected groups ==
=== Descendants of enslaved people ===
In general, black Americans who have any mental illness are resistant to receiving treatment due to stigma, negative conceptions, and fear of discrimination. This reduces the number of those affected to seek help. Lack of treatment causes the symptoms to compound leading to further internalization of distress and a worsening of mental health in the individual. Those affected by race-based trauma oftentimes do not seek treatment not only because of stigma but because of fear that the medical professional will not understand their perspective of a disenfranchised minority. Furthermore, the existing stigma of mental health has led to a lack of research and consequently treatment. However, lack of treatment can also be attributed to the misdiagnosis of symptoms. Signs of trauma exhibited in black children are often labeled as behavioral or educational disabilities, allowing the trauma to go untreated. While trauma symptoms often manifest as other mental illnesses such as depression and anxiety, the larger diagnosis often goes untreated.

=== Koreans ===
Han is a concept of an emotion, variously described as some form of grief or resentment, among others, that is said to be an essential element of Korean identity by some, and a modern post-colonial identity by others.

Michael D. Shin argues that the central aspect of han is loss of identity, and defines han as "the complex of emotions that result from the traumatic loss of collective identity". Han is most commonly associated with divided families: families who were separated during the Korean War. According to Shin, all Koreans may experience han, or a "constant feeling of being less than whole", because of not having a collective identity as a result of the continued division of Korea. Furthermore, new generations of Koreans seemingly inherit it because of growing up in a divided country.

=== Refugees ===
Refugees are often at risk of experiencing transgenerational trauma. While many refugees experience some sort of loss and trauma, war-related trauma has been documented to have longer-lasting effects on mental health and span through more generations. Children are especially prone to the trauma of resettling, as their childhood may have been disrupted by migration to a new country. Additionally, they often face the difficulty of learning a new language, adapting to a new environment, and navigating the school's social system in their host country. Normal caregiving is disrupted by the process of fleeing from their original home, and it may continue to be disrupted by their parents' PTSD symptoms and challenges faced in their new home. Furthermore, many host countries do not provide adequate mental healthcare systems to refugees, which can worsen symptoms and lead to transmission of trauma. In general, children of refugees exhibited higher overall levels of depression, PTSD, anxiety, attention deficiency, stress, and other psychological issues. Most refugees who flee from their homes do so to escape war, conflict, or natural disasters. More oftentimes than not the wellness of refugees' homeland does not improve which causes continuous exposure to the originating trauma. This can be described as secondhand trauma and can be experienced by many. However, the offspring who have both transgenerational trauma and intergenerational trauma may experience secondhand trauma and a greater scale.

==== Vietnam war refugees ====
Since 1975, the US has accepted many refugees from Vietnam, Cambodia, Thailand, and Laos. As a result of the Vietnam War, many of these Southeast Asian refugees are at high risk of experiencing transgenerational trauma. Factors occurring both before and after immigration to America could contribute to traumatization in these groups. Being forced to witness and flee violence and war was a uniquely traumatic occurrence, resulting in high levels of psychological distress. Upon arriving in the United States, Vietnamese Americans struggled to adapt to their new environment, resulting in limited social mobility, high rates of poverty within the community, and exposure to community violence. Exposure to these stressors is correlated with higher trauma symptoms in first-generation Vietnamese-American refugees. In turn, these traumatic experiences impacted the ways that refugees raised their children since they internalized notions of being outsiders in a new country and emphasized success in the face of their many sacrifices. This cultural and familial transmission of trauma has led second-generation Vietnamese Americans to face their own forms of intergenerational trauma. These unique forms of mental health and stress are often not addressed due to socio-cultural standards of silence and refusal to seek treatment.

While a majority of these groups were fleeing war and poverty, Cambodian refugees were also fleeing a genocide from the Khmer Rouge. The atrocities of violence, starvation, and torture were common themes experienced by these refugees. Many Cambodian refugee families refused to talk about their trauma which created an isolating environment for the child. This led to a transmission of trauma through the continuing pattern of silence and refusal to acknowledge an issue or seek treatment. There has also been data showing that the children of survivors from regions with higher rates of violence and mortality displayed stronger overall symptoms. The parenting style of caregivers may also contribute to the rate of impact among children of Khmer Rouge survivors. A 2013 study found that among Khmer Rouge survivors with PTSD who engage in role-reversal parenting, a form of parenting where the parent looks to the child for emotional support, there may be higher rates of anxiety and depression in the children.

=== Indigenous Australians ===
Many Aboriginal Australian and Torres Strait Islander children were forcibly removed from their parents and placed in Aboriginal reserves and missions in the late 19th and first half of the 20th century. Some were subsequently placed with white families, and this practice continued after people were no longer forcibly removed to reserves. These people became known as the Stolen Generations, and successive generations suffer from intergenerational trauma as a result of this as well as other issues related to the colonisation of Australia, such as dispossession of land, loss of language, etc. Many Aboriginal Australians often face discrimination and resistance when trying to access many services including legal, health, housing, and education. It was found that in 2019, 28% of the total prison population consisted of Aboriginal Australians and Torres Strait Islanders. As of 2022, this percentage has increased to 32% of all prisoners. A study consisting of 43 Aboriginal women found that Aboriginal women often face more struggles when incarcerated compared to their peers. With these struggles Aboriginal Australians face, the trauma is often passed down to their offspring as they are on the receiving end of the discrimination, often are targeted themselves as children, or grow up to face similar of not the same struggles as their family members.

=== Native/Indigenous Peoples of the Americas ===
Settler-colonization encompasses a wide range of practices: war, displacement, forced labor, removal of children, relocation, destruction, massacre, genocide, slavery, unintentional and intentional spread of deadly diseases, banning of indigenous language, regulation of marriage, assimilation, eradication of culture, social and spiritual practices. European colonization has, in some instances, involved subjugation of the indigenous peoples of the Americas through violence, ethnic cleansing, forced assimilation, and acculturation. Indian reservations, and harmful policies excluding and oppressing Natives evoked similar responses to trauma as the descendants of Holocaust survivors. In a similar way we find transgenerational trauma in Holocaust survivors we find the same patterns and effects in Indigenous populations and their children and grandchildren.

Due to the effects of settler colonialism, oppression, racism, and other aversive events, Native Americans disproportionately experience adverse childhood experiences as well as health disparities, including high rates of posttraumatic stress, depression, substance abuse, diabetes, and other psychiatric disorders.

=== Military personnel and their families ===
Transgenerational trauma is also commonly known as secondary trauma due to the transmission of symptoms that can take place between individuals in close proximity (i.e., children, spouses/partners, and other family members). Transgenerational trauma affects everyone, including those in the military and their families. Patterns of transgenerational trauma can be recognized through the use of a genogram, a family tree that provides a visual representation of hereditary patterns. Specifically, a trauma-focused genogram can be used with those who suffer from acute stress disorder (ASD) and posttraumatic stress disorder (PTSD). Traumatic family patterns could include things such as sexual abuse, domestic violence, and even things such as natural disasters. This type of genogram is inclusive to military personnel in that it takes into consideration the servicemembers' experiences. Some of these considerations include taking into account how long the servicemember served, what their role was, if they were a prisoner of war and if they witnessed the death or injury of others. However, not all military personnel pass down intergenerational trauma.

Military personnel who have seen or participated in abusive acts of violence have been found to transmit the trauma they experienced to their children. Children of these veterans have been found to suffer from behavioral disturbances such as aggression, hyperactivity, and delinquency. Children whose parent was diagnosed with PTSD had a higher rate of anxiety as well as aggression when compared to children of civilians or non-veterans. These children can also have increased depressive symptoms and other PTSD symptoms. However, it has been found that spouses and partners of military veterans can help to buffer the effects of the transmission of trauma symptomology.

This type of intergenerational trauma can be experienced and transmitted not only to children of veterans but also to their spouses/partners, ultimately affecting the whole family unit. Veterans who experienced PTSD or wartime combat stress reaction (CSR) had spouses/partners who experienced increased psychiatric symptoms. These symptoms included feelings of loneliness and having impaired relationships within the family unit and marriage. Much like veterans who suffer from PTSD, their spouses or partners can suffer from many of the same symptoms as well. Spouses or partners of military veterans can experience the avoidance of thoughts, behaviors, and emotions. Spouses or partners may also experience intrusions such as unwanted cognitions and images that may remind them of the negative experiences of their spouse or partner. Common symptoms of emotional distress that spouses may experience are depression and anxiety. These symptoms are intergenerational trauma symptoms that are being passed down from the veteran to the spouse.

Intergenerational trauma can sometimes go unrecognized by the spouse or partner suffering from the transmission of trauma. It sometimes can be difficult for those suffering from intergenerational trauma to recognize that they are emotionally affected, and thus difficult for these individuals to find treatment. Resources such as a genogram can be an excellent way in which an individual can recognize the trauma that has been passed down to them.

When it comes to transgenerational trauma, it can be transmitted quite quickly and can affect many people in which the servicemember has encountered. This also includes mental health workers and primary care physicians with whom the servicemember may be working. Mental health workers and primary care physicians asked to take a survey entitled "Secondary Traumatic Stress Scale" reported that they had trouble sleeping, feeling emotionally numb, and having intrusive thoughts about clients.

==== Treatment ====
Mental health workers who are considering working with veterans who suffer from PTSD and other traumatic experiences should have experience working with veterans and servicemembers. Cultural sensitivity is another aspect to consider when working with this population. Understanding the military culture and lifestyle is informative when developing the therapeutic relationship and treatment plans. Another cultural consideration is the family component. This can include the servicemember's actual family or their chosen family. The military can bring on a lot of stress when it comes to the servicemember and his family. These include, moving to different places on short notice, deployment plans constantly changing, difficulty transitioning when coming back from deployment, and many other stressors. Therefore, it is crucial that a mental health worker truly understands military life.

In the case of PTSD, in order to prevent or minimize intergenerational trauma, it is important that the family also seek mental health services. A spouse/partner who is receiving mental health services and is at a better place in their life because of these interventions can help the family unit overall. In a military family, the roles are constantly changing due to the servicemember being on deployment and other factors. The family, as a unit, needs to adjust to the servicemember coming into and out of their lives. With a healthy family unit, the spouse/partner becomes a predicting factor of soldier retention and a functioning family unit. Resiliency can also play a role in this dynamic. A few things can contribute to resiliency in a family unit. These include flexibility/organizational style, the family's belief system, and the communication process. These are important things to look for and identify as they can help in the treatment of intergenerational trauma. Making the family unit strong can help to empower each individual member of the family, and together they can overcome intergenerational trauma within the family. Understanding military culture can help aid families through the process of overcoming intergenerational trauma.

In addition to the genograms, solution-focused brief therapy (SFBT) has been found to be successful with military families. It uses an emphasis on the client's successes and creating small steps that are attainable for the client. This type of therapy uses the client's language and experience to address things systematically within the family. SFBT, together with the genograms, can be informative to both the client and clinician and can help to inform the future of practice. As the genograms can help to give a clear picture as to what the trauma patterns are in the family, SFBT can help to change these patterns and provide the family with a healthier way of living and functioning. This specific type of therapy can help to educate the client and their family as to what exactly has been passed down from previous generations. It can also inform the family as to what is now beginning to be transmitted and can help to change the trajectory in the future and change the family dynamic principles.

== Transmission ==
There are many current transgenerational studies that have been done on adults that have experienced natural disasters or adversities. One study found that the children of torture victims showed more symptoms of anxiety, depression, post-traumatic stress, attention deficits, and behavioral disorders than the comparison group of those who had not experienced the specific trauma. A qualitative study was done on the Brazilian children of Holocaust survivors and proposed a supported model of the transgenerational transmission of traumatic experiences but also one of resilience patterns, which can be transmitted in between generations and developed within generations. According to Froma Walsh, resilience theory suggests that individuals' and families' responses to traumatic experiences is an ever-changing process that involves both exposure to challenges and the development of coping mechanisms that aide in one's ability to overcome such challenges. Regardless of risk, there are also opportunities for the development of resilience via exposure to meaningful resources that support one's ability to overcome adversity. The researchers Cowan, Callaghan, and Richardson studied the impact of early-life adversities on individuals and their descendants. Their research was also consistent with the transmission theory in which their findings revealed that the stress phenotype that was expressed in individuals who experienced the adversity was also observed in children and even grandchildren.

The oppression that black people experienced through slavery and racism has a psychological impact on how they view achievement. In terms of the social aspects, that seems to make it difficult for black people to surpass a certain socioeconomic status threshold, escape a certain neighborhood, or move beyond a certain lifestyle or status.

For Native Americans, past government policy and internal displacements are theorized to have an effect even generations later. The social enforcement of their ostracization causes them to be generally removed from society, to be powerless and uninvited in government, and to be left to fend for themselves. The transgenerational transmission of colonial trauma is also considered a contributing factor in the high rates of mental health difficulties that Native Canadian communities experience. Displacement and maltreatment during colonization had led to negative effects in the children of those who survived such experiences. This is passed down generationally via ongoing social marginalization and lateral violence. The loss of cultures and resulting lack of community cohesion poses a further challenge for groups in resolving transgenerational trauma.

The fetal environment is influenced by the maternal diet. This environmental history can cause the fetal developmental response to change to produce a metabolic phenotype that suits the anticipated environment.

It has been suggested that a mother's mood may influence the fetus, though studies on this have mixed results. It is unclear whether any of the effects persist after birth.

== Treatment ==
Because transgenerational trauma is a form of indirect traumatic exposure, it often goes unrecognized or is misdiagnosed by clinicians. A lack of treatment accessibility can have several consequences such as health, behavioral, and social issues that may persist across an individual's lifespan.

The experience of traumatic stress can modify cognitive, behavioral, and physiological functions, which can increase susceptibility to both mental and physical health issues. Because transgenerational trauma is a form of traumatic stress, it can increase risk for developing psychological disorders such as post-traumatic stress disorder, major depressive disorder, generalized anxiety disorder, schizophrenia, autism, and substance use disorders.

Several therapy modalities have been found to be effective in treating various trauma and stress disorders, such as cognitive behavioral therapy, cognitive processing therapy, prolonged exposure, compassion focused therapy, dialectical behavior therapy, and narrative therapy. Each of these therapies share similar components that are useful in addressing trauma, such as psychoeducation, emotion regulation and processing, cognitive processing and reconstruction, and trauma processing. Given that transgenerational trauma is a unique form of traumatic exposure, such therapy modalities can be effective in reducing its negative long-term effects. However, there are specific components of transgenerational trauma that must be addressed directly despite the modality of therapy chosen. Because the attachment relationship between parent or caregiver and child is a dominant mechanism through which transgenerational trauma is transmitted, treatment should focus on the importance familial and interpersonal patterns relative to the client, and utilize attachment-focused interventions.

Effective treatment for those experiencing transgenerational trauma also focuses on exploring, developing, and maintaining protective factors that can reduce the negative impact of transgenerational trauma. Some protective factors include fostering secure attachment between parent and child, as well as having access to several sources of support (i.e., family, peers, community). One treatment model that places focus on the parent-child relationship is the Intergenerational Trauma Treatment Model (ITTM). The model incorporates several features from existing empirically supported methods of treatment, such as trauma exposure, cognitive processing and reframing, stress management, and parent education. ITTM gives specific attention to the intergenerational nature of traumatic experiences and targets the parent's or caregiver's ability to respond to a child's traumatic experiences. Fostering secure attachment and a supportive home environment can mitigate the potential negative impact of transgenerational trauma.

Other less conventional modalities of therapy have also been found useful in addressing the negative impact of transgenerational trauma. Music therapy has been found to be an effective form of treatment for those who have witnessed or experienced a traumatic event. For example, music therapy has been successfully implemented with military personnel, traumatized refugees, and Holocaust survivors. Specifically, analytic music therapy (AMT) was found to be effective in facilitating a degree of healing through self-exploration that mitigates the negative impact of transgenerational trauma. Trauma healing stories have been suggested as a form of therapy.

Outside the treatment modalities described, several tools and techniques were also found to be helpful in bringing awareness to the effects of transgenerational trauma, as well as decreasing its psychological impact. For example, the Transgenerational Script Questionnaire (TSQ) has been used to compliment psychotherapy sessions as a means of helping to develop consciousness of both the internal and external family system. The TSQ targets transgenerational scripts, which are unconscious systemic patterns that persist in families and groups, and are perpetuated through emotions, beliefs, and behaviors. These scripts are then used to explore a client's implicit and explicit perceptions about their family dynamic and system. In using the TSQ, the clinician can guide the client to separate their ancestors' experiences from their own. In more complex cases of intergenerational trauma, the Transgenerational Trauma and Resilience Genogram (TTRG) can help guide clinicians to better understand and assess the impact of such trauma. The TTRG targets the various components that contribute to the maintenance of transgenerational trauma by implementing an ecosystemic view of trauma, as well as attention to specific sociopolitical concerns. The TTRG maps out the family unit, marking those who have experienced trauma and their experience, as well as relationships between individuals, and patterns of functioning. This process allows for clinicians to better assess the origins and maintaining factors of an individual's experience of transgenerational trauma, which ultimately contributes to a more comprehensive conceptualization of treatment.

In conceptualizing treatment for individuals experiencing transgenerational trauma, it is critical to take into account the ways in which various cultural factors impact how different treatments may be received or perceived. Although the mechanisms through which transgenerational trauma are consistent across cultures, there are variations in the degree of salience regarding sociocultural factors that may exacerbate the effects of transgenerational trauma in different marginalized communities. Additionally, therapists must incorporate a culturally responsive perspective to whichever modality of therapy they chose to implement. It is imperative for therapists to focus on establishing a concrete basis of trust and safety within the therapeutic relationship, as several minoritized groups who have transgenerational trauma may have developed significant mistrust within interpersonal interactions, as well as mistrust of larger organizations or institutions.

== Criticism of inherited trauma via epigenetics ==
One discredited model suggests that a parent's trauma could be inherited through an epigenetic biological mechanism. Although the idea has been widely touted in the media, it is not supported by robust evidence.

Research in rodents suggests that epigenetic changes can be observed in genes associated with the hypothalamic-pituitary-adrenal (HPA) axis, which coordinates the body's stress response system. Non-heritable stress-related epigenetic changes have also been studied in monkeys. However, most epigenetic effects are not transmitted to the next generation, and most transfer of information across generations does not involve epigenetic inheritance.

According to geneticist Kevin Mitchell, "these are, in fact, extraordinary claims, and they are being advanced on less than ordinary evidence." He says "This is a malady in modern science: the more extraordinary and sensational and apparently revolutionary the claim, the lower the bar for the evidence on which it is based, when the opposite should be true." Mitchell adds that many have looked at it as a "get out of genetics free card" and adds, "I think people don't like the idea, some people anyway, that we are born with certain predispositions that are hard to change." He says that experiences are expressed through changes in human neuroanatomy, not patterns of gene expression and says that scientists in this area have contributed to the misleading research in this area: "There is a hype industry around science, which I think is corrosive. And I think scientists are willing participants in it in a way that I find more and more distasteful the older I get, because it does a massive disservice cumulatively to how science is understood by the general public because we have this constant hype."

The biologist Ewan Birney specifically criticized a paper which used a sample size of 32 people to back its claim that children of Holocaust survivors showed evidence of inherited stress. He argues that a mechanism for epigenetic inheritance in humans remains elusive due to the many other influencing factors including "complex societal forces that persist over time", and the fact that human developing females already have all their eggs as a foetus in the womb, and lastly that throughout one individual's life epigenetic influences remain so influential that "epigenetic cell memory" is what cause our genetically identical cells to differentiate into their specific forms. Furthermore, even in mice, where these confounding influences can be controlled, "true trans-generational epigenetic inheritance is extremely rare."

A 2026 review examining the transgenerational inheritance of post-traumatic stress disorder (PTSD) and war-related trauma confirmed these methodological limitations in the human literature. While some studies report DNA methylation variations in stress-related genes (such as FKBP5, NR3C1, NR3C2, and BDNF) among parents or offspring exposed to combat or genocide, the results across the field remain highly inconsistent. The reviewers concluded that genuine epigenetic inheritance and causality cannot be definitively established, as the majority of existing human studies are heavily limited by small sample sizes, cross-sectional designs, and an inability to adequately control for environmental and psychosocial confounding variables.

To address the ongoing controversy and methodological bottlenecks in mammalian models, recent literature has proposed stringent validation frameworks. A 2025 review examining the transgenerational transmission of acquired nervous system phenotypes emphasized that establishing true epigenetic inheritance of trauma requires overcoming severe confounding factors, including postnatal care, the maternal uterine environment, and the global epigenetic reprogramming that naturally erases most DNA methylation during embryonic development. The authors critique the frequent misapplication of the term "transgenerational" in trauma literature, noting that many studies erroneously conflate it with "intergenerational" inheritance—where the F1 fetus or F2 germ cells are directly exposed to the maternal stressor in utero. To definitively prove that behavioral or stress-related traits are inherited epigenetically rather than socially or genetically, it has been proposed that researchers meet strict criteria: the phenotype and corresponding molecular marks must persist into unexposed generations (the F2 generation for paternal exposure, or F3 for maternal), transmission must be isolated to the germ cells, and study designs must utilize absolute controls like cross-fostering and in vitro fertilization to exclude environmental transmission.

Furthermore, human observational cohorts are inevitably confounded by socioeconomic status, culture, and parenting practices, which can easily mimic or obscure epigenetic inheritance. The review also cautions against the ethical and societal risks of attributing psychiatric or cognitive vulnerabilities to ancestral epigenetic trauma; doing so without solid mechanistic proof risks stigmatizing families or inappropriately blaming prior generations.

== See also ==
- American Indian boarding schools
- Intergenerationality
- Collective memory
- National memory
- Post Traumatic Slave Syndrome
- Seasoning (slavery)
- Second-generation Holocaust Syndrome
- Slave health on plantations in the United States
- Slavery hypertension hypothesis
- Transgenerational epigenetic inheritance
- Weathering hypothesis
