= Jay S. Kaufman =

- Born: July 26, 1963 (age 63)
- Education: University of Michigan
- Known for: Work on race and health
- Awards: Canada Research Chair (2010-2017); Robert Wood Johnson Foundation Investigator Award in Health Policy Research (2006-08)
- Scientific career
- Fields: Epidemiology
- Workplaces: McGill University; UNC Gillings School of Global Public Health
- Thesis: Blood Pressure in Urban and Rural Nigeria: Dietary, Psychosocial and Anthropometric Determinants (1995)
- Doctoral advisor: Sherman A. James
- Website: www.jayskaufman.com

Jay Scott Kaufman (born July 26, 1963) is a professor in the Department of Epidemiology, Biostatistics, & Occupational Health at McGill University, where he was a Canada Research Chair in Health Disparities (2010–2017). He also served (2020–2021) as the president of the Society for Epidemiological Research.
