= Conscious Community =

Loose affiliation of allied Black groups

The Conscious Community, also known as the Black Conscious Community and the African Conscious Community, is a loose affiliation of allied groups composed of individuals from the African diaspora and from Africa. Pan-Africanism, Afrocentrism, Afrofuturism, Black Nationalism, and Black Liberation Religion/Spirituality are foundational sources for the ideologies found among individuals in the Black Conscious Community.

== History ==
Following the time when minister Louis Farrakhan started to lead the Nation of Islam in 1981, amid the crack epidemic impacting the Black American community and the act of police brutality against Rodney King in 1991, the teachings of Afrocentricity and the Nation of Islam influenced the development of Black Conscious/Political Hip Hop (e.g., Brand Nubian, KRS-One, Public Enemy, Queen Latifah, X Clan) and ushered in a resurgence of Black radicalism and African-centered consciousness. The Nation of Domination, thematically styled after the Nation of Islam by the World Wrestling Federation, developed as a result of the national predominance of Black radicalism amid the 1990s. The virtually-oriented Conscious Community is a legacy of this resurgence.

In 2018, Nike created RBG-colored, Black History Month Air Force One athletic shoes, which was likely inspired by the popularity of Pan-African colors (red, black, and green) among businesses and individuals in the Black Conscious Community.

== Philosophy ==
=== Consciousness ===
In order to comprehend double consciousness, how Black people conceptualize and experience blackness must first be comprehended. In The Souls of Black Folk, William Edward Burghardt Du Bois highlighted the concepts of consciousness or woke-ness in relation to the concept of double consciousness (a "two-ness" of competing thoughts, ideals, efforts, and psyches – competition between one's "Negro"-ness and one's "American"-ness) in African Americans. The internalized competition of African American double-consciousness reflected the broader reality of an internal effort made by African Americans to establish a potent personal sense of self and self-respect amid an anti-African American environment created by European Americans. Within the Black American community, being "conscious" or "woke" is having a conscious awareness of the public problems in the community and having an intricate understanding of how the various dimensions (e.g., cultural, ethical, historical, philosophical, socioeconomic) of those public problems are interconnected; self-guided study, along with sharing the knowledge acquired through that study with others, are also considered aspects of being "conscious" or "woke."

=== Values and views ===
The Conscious Community, which includes African American social media influencers and activists, is a major development in the history of Black consciousness, Black radicalism, and technology. As part of the cultural tradition of Black radicalism, individuals in the Black Conscious Community use various social media platforms (e.g., BlogTalkRadio, Facebook, Instagram, Snapchat, Twitter, YouTube) for the purpose of aiding Black and African peoples in their collective effort to resist and eventually overcome racist oppression and a perceived global system of white supremacy, to achieve liberation and self-determination of Black people throughout the world, to radically shift the paradigm and reality in which Black and African peoples currently live, and to replace present, predominant Black ideologies and organizations with Afrocentric and Black nationalist ideologies and courses of action.

Pan-Africanism, Afrocentrism, Afrofuturism, Black Nationalism, and Black Liberation Religion/Spirituality (e.g., Afrikan Village, Black Hebrew Israelites, Candomblé, Ifá, Kemetic Science, Metaphysics, Mysticism, Moorish Science Temple of America, Occultism, Nation of Gods and Earths, Nation of Islam, Nuwaubian Nation, Palo, Rastafari, Temple of New African Thought, Santería, Shrine of the Black Madonna, Vodun, and to a limited extent, atheism and agnosticism), which are primary elements in the Black radical tradition, are foundational sources for the ideologies found among individuals in the Black Conscious Community. African-centered scholars and race critics who have been intellectual influences for individuals in the Conscious Community include the following: Amos Wilson, Chancellor Williams, Cheikh Anta Diop, Frances Cress Welsing, George G.M. James, Ivan Van Sertima, James Smalls, John Henrik Clarke, Joy DeGruy, Leonard Jeffries, Maulana Karenga, Mfundishi Jhutyms, Yosef Ben-Jochannan, and Reggie Mabry as well as Dick Gregory, Neely Fuller Jr., and Steve Cokely. Due to Western education being viewed as innately anti-Black, and informed by these foundational sources, individuals in the Conscious Community have sought to create their own educational platforms and organizations. Kwanzaa is also a popular African-centered holiday of seven principles celebrated and practiced in the daily lives of individuals in the Conscious Community.

As Black Nationalism is grounded in the notion of Black people resisting (e.g., not conforming, not assimilating, not integrating) a perceived global system and culture of white supremacy and developing their own institutions (e.g., cultural, defense, educational, economic, political, religious, social), individuals in the Conscious Community encourage the creation of such institutions (e.g., African-centered schools, African-inspired holistic health centers, independent Black media) in the Black community. As Pan-Africanism is grounded in the notion of African pride and unity for the purpose of enhancing the overall living circumstances of all Black and African peoples, individuals in the Conscious Community encourage and support Pan-Africanism. Continental Africans who are strong proponents of Afrocentrism and Black Nationalism, such as Julius Malema, are viewed favorably, whereas those who are not are viewed critically by individuals in the Conscious Community. As with Marcus Garvey's Pan-Africanist goals, the intent is for continental Africans and the African diaspora to take ownership of and manage the natural resources of continental Africa and the global affairs of African peoples as well as to unify (e.g., economically, politically, socially) so as to be able to effectively address the oppression of Black peoples throughout the world. Among some individuals in the Conscious Community, there is a common belief that phenomena of the world do not operate in the way humans believe them to; consequently, Afrofuturism is used to philosophize about the deeper meaning of reality and life, to decrypt physical and metaphysical events, and, along with ideas from physics (e.g., quantum, theoretical), used to decrypt and predict events and phenomenon (e.g., astrology, dreams, melanin, natural disasters, numerology, solar eclipses, Super Bowl winners).

A common view held among the individuals in the Conscious Community is that continental Africans and the African diaspora, as well as other humans, are socially conditioned or coerced by a perceived global system of white supremacy to maintain a stupored state of mind rather than liberate their minds and themselves from their oppressive realities. Another common view held among individuals in the Conscious Community is that the effects of long-term oppression (e.g., enslavement, Jim Crow, colonialism, practicing Christianity, being a patron of businesses not owned by conscious Black people, serving in the military, being educated in Western schools/universities, being treated in Western hospitals and by Western doctors, voting in elections), under a perceived global system of white supremacy, is viewed as being purposed to serve and further the collective interests of Europeans and is viewed as having set Black people into a psychological state of unconsciousness, deep sleep, and/or fear; consequently, individuals in the Conscious Community have sought to create, own, and operate their own society as well as re-adopt traditional African religions. Individuals in the Conscious Community seek to, and encourage continental Africans and the African diaspora to, recreate a form of classical African civilization in the modern era, which is independent of Western civilization as well as rooted in Afrocentrism and Black nationalism. At-large, individuals in the Conscious Community do not advocate for the oppression of white people, and their ultimate goal is not Black supremacy.

Individuals in the Conscious Community tend to be generally conservative (socially, politically, economically) – a type of conservatism grounded in Black nationalism and traditional African values, liberal when it comes to freethinking, generally indifferent toward and distrusting of predominant politics (e.g., Democratic Party, Republican Party) and predominant political systems, and generally trusting of their Black forerunners who were rooted in the Black radical tradition (e.g., Elijah Muhammad, Marcus Garvey, Noble Drew Ali). Despite the mistrust of predominant politics, reparations for Black suffering (e.g., enslavement, Jim Crow) remains a common objective. Individuals in the Conscious Community tend to be conservative on matters relating to feminism and homosexuality; the general view on gender roles is that Black men should protect Black women and children; the general view on homosexuality is that it is not natural, not moral, not productive, anti-African, and against the complementary concept of the Black family unit (Black man, Black woman, and Black child). There is a view held among some individuals in the Conscious Community that there is a concerted effort by the US government and mass media to promote homosexuality, specifically hyper-feminine homosexuality, in the Black American community and in countries with predominantly Black populations; this perceived attempt by the US government and mass media to effeminize Black men, along with the view that same-sex relationships contribute to the population decline, have resulted in it being characterized as and equated with "buck-breaking." In particular, Mwalimu Baruti is of the view that when some people of African descent, who are oppressed by European society and cultural imperialism like other people of African descent, seek to come back to their African cultural orientation as they enter into the Conscious Community, intentionally or unintentionally, they bring along with them misoriented philosophies and behaviors, including "sexual misorientation", from European culture and society. Additionally, Baruti is of the view that, as a service to European interests, some people of African descent enter into the Conscious Community to intentionally promote "sexual misorientation" within it.

Individuals in the Conscious Community oppose both a perceived global system of white supremacy and the perceived predominant norms (e.g., political, economic, cultural) it has created among continental Africans and African Americans. In addition to viewing a perceived global system of white supremacy as a primary form of opposition, individuals in the Conscious Community view the "Black bourgeoisie" as another form of opposition, based on the view that they have betrayed the cause of self-determination for Black and African peoples. In order to be able to effectively stand against perceived government corruption, individuals in the Conscious Community encourage Black and African peoples to have a deeper appreciation for and comprehension of radical Black thought and the Afrocentric cultural tradition. Individuals in the Conscious Community use informational warfare, composed of radical and revolutionary content (e.g., pro-Black, pro-sovereign, anti-integrationist, and non-conformist), with the intention of combating a perceived predominant system and culture of white supremacy so as to achieve their goal of creating a liberated and self-determining Black nation, which is believed to be necessary for the survival of both continental Africans and members of the African diaspora. "Web-Oblutionary" or "YouTube Revolutionary" are also considered to be offensive terms to apply to individuals in the Conscious Community, as it is seen as belittling the value of the work (e.g., virtual, in-person) that individuals in the Conscious Community have been and are undertaking.

Individuals in the Black Conscious Community tend to have an awareness of power dynamics being essential to comprehending the nature of race as well as the African contributions to and origins of civilization. Individuals in the Black Conscious Community also share a common commitment to the subversion of and resistance against racist oppression and a perceived global system of white supremacy. While Black Lives Matter may bear some similarities with the Black Conscious Community, the two are distinct from one another in their liberation methods, philosophies, politics, and associations. Political, religious, cultural, and ideological differences among individuals in the Conscious Community can result in internal contention and internet debate, but despite the internal struggles individuals in the Conscious Community share and collaborate to achieve the common goal of liberating continental Africans and the African diaspora.

New York is a notable location (e.g., 125th Street in Harlem) for individuals in the Black Conscious Community. Hip Hop culture, as a culture cultivated from African American struggles of living under oppressive conditions, has become a major source of influence (e.g., hardcore messages) for individuals in the Black Conscious Community. For the audience of conscious rap music, which is a subculture set in contrast to the predominant culture of mainstream rap, it can generate a form of African political consciousness. Consequently, the mentality of a “New Afrikan” is cultivated in its audience. For those who agree with the message of conscious rap, they may begin to embrace aspects of the culture (e.g., wearing red, black, and green; share in the goals of African American self-determination and independence) of the New Afrikan. New Afrikan culture has influenced major cities (e.g., Atlanta, Georgia) that host the Conscious Community. Many of the individuals within the “True School”, or Conscious Community within the Hip Hop culture of Atlanta, Georgia, derive from the northeastern United States, especially Long Island, New York, from which many artists of the Golden Age Hip Hop era derive. Other locations with a presence of the Black Conscious Community include North Omaha, Nebraska, Britain, and South Africa.

Among other African American identities, there is the identity of the “subverter” (e.g., Minister Louis Farrakhan), who is largely disconnected from the United States, though tied to it through the injustices and inequities witnessed and experienced in the Black community, and more connected to another envisioned home (e.g., metaphoric homeland, the Caribbean, Africa). The concept of a “Black community” or “Black nation” includes various groups of Black identity and African ancestry (e.g., Black Conscious Community, Black Nationalists, Afrocentrists, Black Religionists). The “subverter” Black identity encompasses various Black philosophies, communities, and identities (e.g., Black Liberation Theology, Black Nationalism, Black Power, Black Lives Matter, the Nation of Islam, the Conscious Community), and, rather than express patriotic allegiance for the United States of America, patriotic allegiance is expressed for the “Black community” or “Black nation” (e.g., Black power as a form of patriotic allegiance expressed for the “Black nation” by individuals in the Conscious Community or Nation of Islam).

Among individuals in the African Conscious Community, natural health (e.g., beliefs, practices, dietary change) is regarded to be a key value and is viewed as essential for regeneration of the spiritual growth in the African American community and recovery of ancient African culture (e.g., culture of Kemet). Vegetarianism and Black militancy are also regarded to be key values held among individuals in the African Conscious Community, which developed in response to how African Americans have been treated. Along with the emergence of related groups (e.g., Nation of Islam, Hebrew Israelites/African American Jews, artistic/spiritual organizations) in response to the negative portrayals of African American culture in the predominant European American culture, amid the African Consciousness and Black Power movement of the 1960s and 1970s, natural health as a key value developed in an overall effort to positively change (e.g., reconfigure the collective self-image and reconstruct an ideal view of African history for the purpose of moving beyond a collective history of being exploited and oppressed and toward a more ideal collective future) and regenerate the African American community.

Embodied in the ancient Egyptian proverb, “Man, Know Thyself”, the purpose of the solutions proposed by individuals in the Conscious Community are for the restoration of Black and African peoples to their precolonial state of high culture and civilization.

== Reception ==
Brown (2013) regards the Black Conscious Community and Black nationalist ideologies to be sources of homophobia in the African American community.

Redding (2017) indicated that, through white-owned Black media and broadcast of Gangsta rap, gangsta stereotypes were relayed to and reproduced in the minds of Black people, racist stereotypes were reinforced in the minds of white people that contributed to Black people being reduced to these gangsta stereotypes, and whiteness and the culture of white supremacy were reinforced. Redding (2015) also regards individuals in the Conscious Community, specifically conscious Black media professionals, to be griots within the Black community who combat the negative impacts of Gangsta rap and gangsta stereotypes in the Black community.

Due to the predominant use of traditional knowledge from East Africa and Egyptology among individuals in the Black Conscious Community, some critics tend to identify individuals in the Black Conscious Community as "Hoteps."

Some individuals within the Conscious Community rename themselves with African names, which has been seen as peculiar by others in the African American community, found hard to pronounce, and even seen as conversion to a religion (e.g., Nation of Islam).

Individuals within the Conscious Community of South Africa have been viewed by some Black South African students as being philosophers with an expertise in the condition of Black people, who are also particularly focused on appearing to be intellectual and using complex words in English, rather than communicating simply and being action-oriented, with practical solutions, as it relates to building "Black Power."

Jordan (2018) was critical of the Conscious Community's, and the Hip Hop community's, perceived view that Afrocentrism and feminism are antithetical to one another, as well as both communities' perceived adherence to the view that the traditional gender roles of Black women are a prerequisite for the reunification of the Black family, restoration of the Black community, and essential to being true to the ideals of Afrocentrism. Additionally, Jordan (2018) was critical of both communities' perceived limiting of Black women to dichotomous labels (e.g., Afrocentric or feminist, queen or bitch/ho), which then makes way for certain behaviors being attributable to oppression from Eurocentrism.

In response to how to address colorism and proposed solution of finding empowerment through embracing one's own melanin, Blackness, Africanness, and dark skin, Ali recognized the role of the Conscious Community as being one of raising the conscious awareness of one's Africanness among and within people of African descent. Ali is also of the view that, due to colorism from among people in the African diaspora and racism from Europeans, there has been a need for and existence of centers like the Conscious Community for the past 400 years.

Based on the view that the Black Conscious Community, or Black nationalists, are searching for an African cultural identity within Christianity, Robinson (2020) suggested for Christian evangelism to approach African American Christianity through an Afrocentric perspective (e.g., highlight the history of African culture in relation to the experience of being Christian). As the African presence and influence in the history of Christianity tends to go unnoted, by doing so, as Robinson (2020) suggests, it can result in acquiring a deeper understanding and appreciation of African ancestry (e.g., African genetics) and African history (e.g., Christian African kingdoms) in relation to the historic development of Christianity. The relevance of this evangelical approach is viewed by Robinson (2020) as contributing to the development of a positive self-image for African Americans.

Lyons (2021) highlights traits about the Black Conscious Community that appeal to Black women, such as addressing Black women in an affirming manner (e.g., queen, sistah) rather than a denigrating manner (e.g., bitch, ho), encouraging individually customizable spirituality in contrast to some forms of restrictive organized religion, inclusive spiritual leadership positions for Black women in contrast to some forms of religious leadership positions that are exclusionary toward Black women, growing public acceptance and popularity of witchcraft, and the valuing of the natural beauty of Black women. Despite this, Lyons (2021) critiqued the Black Conscious Community, along with feminism and its highlighted traits, and characterized both as “lifeless boats” for Black women and “demonic,” as well as recommended that urban Christian apologists affirm and promote the gospel of Jesus in a manner that appeals to and addresses the criticisms and concerns of Black women.

Mason (2021) critiqued the commonly held view in the Black Conscious Community that Christianity is detrimental to Black people and common portrayal of Christianity being a European religion. While recognizing the historic dehumanization of Black people by Europeans and European Christianity, Mason (2021) contends that Christianity, as a whole, should not be dismissed by the Black Conscious Community, and that commonly held views within the Black Conscious Community are incorrect. Furthermore, Mason (2021) contends that urban Christian apologists need to correct the fallacies about Christianity commonly held and promoted by the Black Conscious Community.

Salima, who was involved in the Detroit Independent Freedom School Movement (DIFS), indicated that, while the Conscious Community served as an avenue toward community education and liberation for Black Americans, it was the responsibility of individuals to further develop the knowledge that they had initially received.
