= Post Traumatic Slave Syndrome =

2005 theoretical book by Joy DeGruy Leary

- Author: Joy DeGruy Leary
- Subject: Transgenerational trauma, racial inequality in the United States, racism in the United States
- Genre: Sociology / race relations
- Published: 2005
- Publisher: Uptone Press
- Publication place: United States
- Pages: 235 pages
- ISBN: 0-9634011-2-2
- Website: https://www.joydegruy.com/

Post Traumatic Slave Syndrome: America's Legacy of Enduring Injury and Healing is a 2005 theoretical work by Joy DeGruy Leary. The book argues that the experience of slavery in the United States and the continued discrimination and oppression endured by African Americans creates intergenerational psychological trauma, leading to a psychological and behavioral syndrome common among present-day African Americans, manifesting as a lack of self-esteem, persistent feelings of anger, and internalized racist beliefs. The book was first published by Uptone Press in Milwaukie, Oregon, in 2005, with a later re-release by the author in 2017.

== Post traumatic slave syndrome ==
Expanding on a hypothesis of "post-traumatic slavery syndrome" (PTSS) by psychiatrist Alvin Francis Poussaint and journalist Amy L. Alexander, DeGruy wrote in her 2001 doctoral thesis that African Americans "sustained a traumatic injury as a direct result of slavery and continue to be injured by traumas caused by the larger society's policies of inequality, racism, and oppression". This is summed up in Post Traumatic Slave Syndrome as:

Multigenerational trauma together with continued oppression and absence of opportunity to access the benefits available in the society.

In the book, DeGruy argues that PTSS is a result of unresolved post-traumatic stress disorder arising from the experience of slavery, transmitted across generations down to the present day, along with the stress of contemporary racial prejudice (e.g. via racial microaggressions). It manifests as a psychological, spiritual, emotional, and behavioral syndrome that results in a lack of self-esteem, persistent feelings of anger, and internalized racist beliefs.

DeGruy states that PTSS is not a disorder that can be treated and remedied clinically but instead requires profound social change in individuals, as well as in institutions, that continue to reify inequality and injustice toward the descendants of enslaved Africans.

The theory has been generative of subsequent academic work in clinical psychology and black studies.

== Reception ==
In addition to forming the basis of public lectures and workshops offered by DeGruy and her contemporaries, the research described in Post Traumatic Slave Syndrome inspired an eponymous play, staged at the Henry Street Settlement Experimental Theater in 2001.

Historian Ibram X. Kendi writes that the PTSS hypothesis pathologizes African Americans and is itself racist.

== See also ==
- Historical trauma
- Slavery hypertension hypothesis
- Sociology of race and ethnic relations
- Weathering hypothesis
