= Aftermath of the Holocaust =

The Holocaust had a deep effect on society both in Europe and the rest of the world, and today its consequences are still being felt, both by children and adults whose ancestors were victims of this genocide.

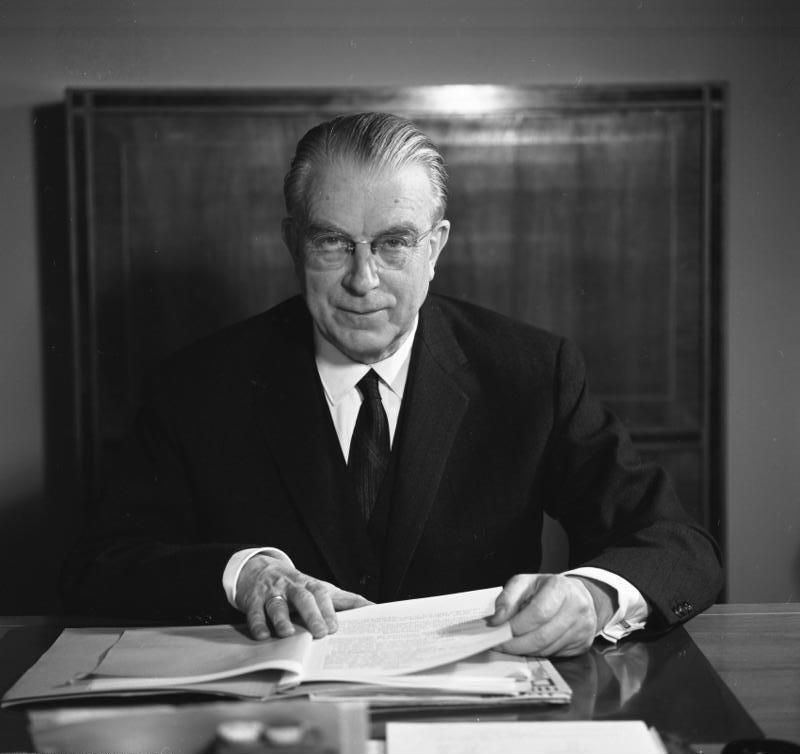
Konrad Adenauer's State Secretary, Hans Globke, played a major role in drafting antisemitic Nuremberg Race Laws.

== Evidence in Germany ==
German society largely responded to the enormity of the evidence for and the horror of the Holocaust with an attitude of self-justification and a practice of keeping quiet. Germans attempted to rewrite their own history to make it more palatable in the post-war era. For decades, West Germany and then unified Germany refused to allow access to its Holocaust-related archives in Bad Arolsen, citing privacy concerns. In May 2006, a 20-year effort by the United States Holocaust Memorial Museum led to the announcement that 30–50 million pages would be made available to survivors, historians and others.

== Survivors ==
=== Displaced persons and the State of Israel ===
The Holocaust and its aftermath left millions of refugees, including many Jews who had lost most or all of their family members and possessions, and often faced persistent antisemitism in their home countries. The original plan of the Allies was to repatriate these "displaced persons" to their countries of origin, but many refused to return, or were unable to as their homes or communities had been destroyed. As a result, more than 250,000 languished in displaced persons camps for years after the war ended. Many American-run DP camps had horrific conditions, with inmates living under armed guard, as revealed in the Harrison Report.

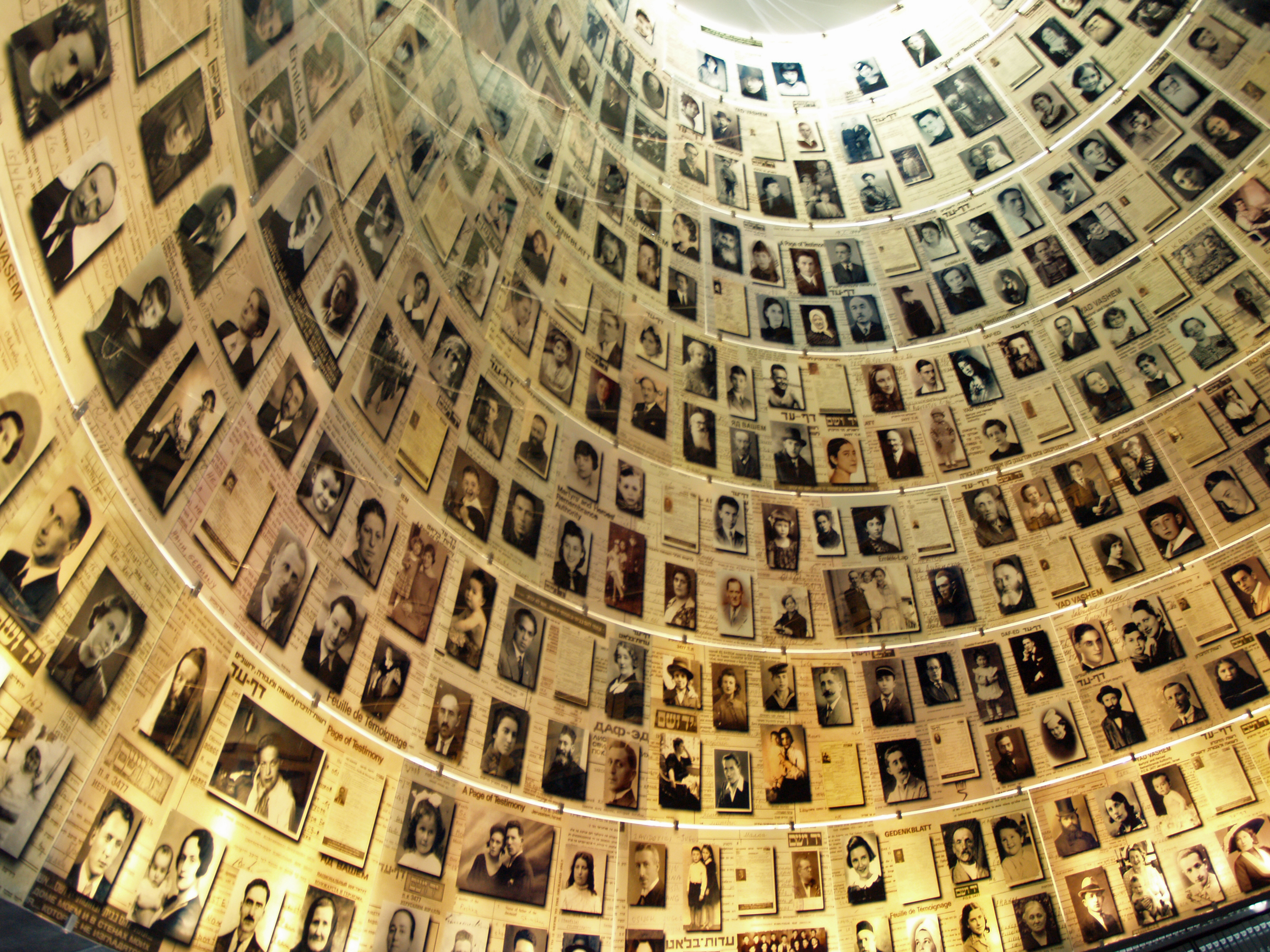
The Hall of Names in Yad Vashem containing Pages of Testimony commemorating the millions of Jews who were murdered during the Holocaust

With most displaced persons being unable or unwilling to return to their former homes in Europe, and with restrictions to immigration to many western countries remaining in place, the British Mandate of Palestine became the primary destination for many Jewish refugees. However, as local Arabs opposed their immigration, the United Kingdom refused to allow Jewish refugees into the Mandate territory. Countries in the Soviet Bloc made emigration difficult. Former Jewish partisans in Europe, along with the Haganah in British Mandate of Palestine, organized a massive effort to smuggle Jews into Palestine, called Berihah, which eventually transported 250,000 Jews (both displaced persons and those who had been in hiding during the war) to Mandate Palestine. After the State of Israel declared independence in 1948, Jews were able to emigrate to Israel legally and without restriction. By 1952, when the displaced persons camps were closed, there were more than 80,000 Jewish former displaced persons in the United States, about 136,000 in Israel, and another 10,000 in other countries, including Mexico, Japan, and countries in Africa and South America.

The Jewish population still remains below pre-Holocaust levels. According to the Central Bureau of Statistics of Israel, the world Jewish population reached 15.2 million by the end of 2020 – approximately 1.4 million less than on the eve of the Holocaust in 1939, when the number was 16.6 million.

=== Resurgence of antisemitism ===
The few Jews in Poland were augmented by returnees from the Soviet Union and survivors from camps in Germany. However, a resurgence of antisemitism in Poland, in such incidents as the Kraków pogrom on August 11, 1945, and the Kielce pogrom on July 4, 1946, led to the exodus of a large part of the Jewish population, which no longer felt safe in Poland. Anti-Jewish riots also broke out in several other Polish cities where many Jews were killed.

The atrocities were motivated in part by the widespread Polish idea of "Żydokomuna" (Judeo-Communism) which cast Jews as supporters of communism. Żydokomuna was one of the causes that led to an intensification of Polish antisemitism in 1945–48, which some have argued was worse than prior to 1939; hundreds of Jews were killed in anti-Jewish violence. Some Jews were killed for merely attempting to recover their property. As a result of the exodus, the number of Jews in Poland decreased from 200,000 in the years immediately after the war to 50,000 in 1950 and 6,000 by the 1980s.

Lesser post-war pogroms also broke out in Hungary.

=== Welfare in Israel ===
It was reported in May 2016 that 45,000 Holocaust survivors are living below the poverty line in Israel, and in need of more assistance. Situations like these result in heated and dramatic protests on the part of some survivors against the Israeli government and related agencies. The average rate of cancer among survivors is nearly two and a half times the national average, while the average rate of colon cancer, attributed to the victims' experience of starvation and extreme stress, is nine times higher. As of 2016, the population of survivors that live in Israel had fallen to 189,000.

=== Searching for records of victims ===
There has been a recent resurgence of interest among descendants of survivors in researching the fates of their relatives. Yad Vashem provides a searchable database of three million names, about half of the known Jewish victims. Yad Vashem's Central Database of Shoah Victims Names is searchable over the internet yadvashem.org or in person at the Yad Vashem complex in Israel. Other databases and lists of victims' names, some searchable over the internet, are listed in Holocaust (resources).

== Impact on culture ==
=== Effect on the Yiddish language and culture ===
In the decades preceding World War II, there was a tremendous growth in the recognition of Yiddish as an official Jewish European language, and there was even a Yiddish renaissance, particularly in Poland. On the eve of World War II, there were 11 to 13 million speakers of Yiddish in the world. The Holocaust destroyed the Eastern European bedrock of Yiddish, though the language was rapidly declining anyhow. In the 1920s and 1930s the Soviet Jewish public rejected the cultural autonomy which was offered to it by the government and opted for Russification: while 70.4% of Soviet Jews declared Yiddish their mother tongue in 1926, only 39.7% did so in 1939. Even in Poland, where harsh discrimination left the Jews as a cohesive ethnic group, Yiddish was rapidly declining in favour of Polonization. 80% of the entire Jewish population declared Yiddish its mother tongue in 1931, but among high school students this number fell to 53% in 1937. In the United States, the preservation of the language was always a unigenerational phenomenon, and the immigrants' children quickly abandoned it for English.

Starting with the Nazi invasion of Poland in 1939, and continuing with the destruction of Yiddish culture in Europe during the remainder of the war, the Yiddish language and culture were almost completely rooted out of Europe. The Holocaust led to a dramatic decline in the use of Yiddish, because the extensive Jewish communities, both secular and religious, that used Yiddish in their day-to-day lives were largely destroyed. Around five million victims of the Holocaust, or 85% of the total, were speakers of Yiddish.

=== Holocaust theology ===
Holocaust theology is a body of theological and philosophical debate concerning the role of God in the universe in light of the Holocaust of the late 1930s and 1940s. It is primarily found in Judaism; Jews were drastically affected by the Holocaust, in which six million Jews were murdered in a genocide by Nazi Germany and its allies. (Note: Snyder 2010, p. 45. Further examples of this usage can be found in: Bauer 2002, , Longerich 2012,) Jews were murdered in higher proportions than other groups; some scholars limit the definition of the Holocaust to the Jewish victims of the Nazis as Jews alone were targeted for the Final Solution. Others include the additional five million non-Jewish victims, bringing the total to about 11 million. One third of the total worldwide Jewish population was murdered during the Holocaust. The Eastern European Jewish population was particularly hard hit, being reduced by ninety percent.

Judaism, Christianity, and Islam have traditionally taught that God is omniscient (all-knowing), omnipotent (all-powerful), and omnibenevolent (all-good) in nature. However, these views are in apparent contrast with the injustice and suffering in the world. Monotheists seek to reconcile this view of God with the existence of evil and suffering. In so doing, they are confronting what is known as the problem of evil.

Within all of the monotheistic faiths many answers (theodicies) have been proposed. In light of the magnitude of depravity seen in the Holocaust, many people have also re-examined classical views on this subject. A common question raised in Holocaust theology is "How can people still have any kind of faith after the Holocaust?"

Orthodox Jews have stated that the fact that the Holocaust happened does not diminish the belief in God. For a creation will never be able to fully grasp the creator, just as a child in an operating theater can not fathom why people are cutting up a live person's body. As the Lubavitcher Rebbe once told Elie Wiesel, after witnessing the Holocaust and realizing how low human beings can stoop, who can we trust, if not God? Nevertheless, Orthodox Judaism does encourage us to pray and cry out to God, and complain to him how he lets bad things happen.

=== Art and literature ===
Theodor Adorno commented that "writing poetry after Auschwitz is barbaric," and the Holocaust has indeed had a profound impact on art and literature, for both Jews and non-Jews. Some of the more famous works are by Holocaust survivors or victims, such as Elie Wiesel, Primo Levi, Viktor Frankl and Anne Frank, but there is a substantial body of literature and art in many languages. Indeed, Paul Celan wrote his poem "Todesfuge" as a direct response to Adorno's dictum.

The Holocaust has also been the subject of many films, including Oscar winners Schindler's List, The Pianist and Life Is Beautiful. With the aging population of Holocaust survivors, there has been increasing attention in recent years to preserving the memory of the Holocaust. The result has included extensive efforts to document their stories, including the Survivors of the Shoah project and Four Seasons Documentary, as well as institutions devoted to memorializing and studying the Holocaust, including Yad Vashem in Israel and the US Holocaust Museum. The historic tale of the Danish Jews fleeing to Sweden by fishing boat is recounted in an award-winning American children's novel.

=== Pre-1945 European art ===
The Holocaust also had a devastating impact on already-extant art. From 1933 to 1945, Nazi Germany stole approximately 600,000 works of art worth $2.5 billion in 1945 U.S. dollars (equivalent to $35 billion in 2025) from museums and private collections across Europe. Works of art belonging to Jews were prime targets for confiscation. As an heir of one Holocaust victim later explained: "You ask, did they kill? Yes, they killed. They killed for art, when it suited them. So killing Jews and confiscating art somehow went together." Thus, any work of art that existed prior to 1945 has a potential provenance problem.

This is a serious obstacle for anyone who currently collects pre-1945 European art. To avoid wasting thousands or even millions of dollars, they must verify (normally with the assistance of an art historian and a lawyer specializing in art law) that potential acquisitions were not stolen by the Nazis from Holocaust victims. The highest-profile legal cases arising from this issue are the U.S. Supreme Court decisions of Republic of Austria v. Altmann (2004) and Germany v. Philipp (2021).

== Reparations ==
In the immediate aftermath of the Second World War, the Jewish Agency led by Chaim Weizmann submitted to the Allies a memorandum demanding reparations to Jews by Germany but it received no answer. In March 1951, a new request was made by Israel's foreign minister Moshe Sharett which claimed global recompense to Israel of $1.5 billion based on the financial cost absorbed by Israel for the rehabilitation of 500,000 Jewish survivors. West German chancellor Konrad Adenauer accepted these terms and declared he was ready to negotiate other reparations. A Conference on Jewish Material Claims against Germany was opened in New York City by Nahum Goldmann in order to help with individual claims. After negotiations, the claim was reduced to a sum of $845 million direct and indirect compensations to be installed in a period of 14 years. In 1988, West Germany allocated another $125 million for reparations.

In 1999, many German industries such as Deutsche Bank, Siemens or BMW faced lawsuits for their role in the forced labour during World War II. In order to dismiss these lawsuits, Germany agreed to raise $5 billion of which Jewish forced laborers still alive could apply to receive a lump sum payment of between $2,500 and $7,500. In 2012, Germany agreed to pay a new reparation of €772 million as a result of negotiations with Israel.

In 2014, the SNCF, the French state-owned railway company, was compelled to allocate $60 million to American Jewish Holocaust survivors for its role in the transport of deportees to Germany. It corresponds to approximately $100,000 per survivor. Although the SNCF was forced by German authorities to cooperate in providing transport for French Jews to the border and did not make any profit from this transport, according to Serge Klarsfeld, president of the organization Sons and Daughters of Jewish Deportees from France.

These reparations were sometimes criticized in Israel where they were seen as "blood money". The American professor Norman Finkelstein wrote The Holocaust Industry to denounce how the American Jewish establishment exploits the memory of the Nazi Holocaust for political and financial gain, as well as to further the interests of Israel. These reparations also led to a massive scam where $57 million were fraudulently given to thousands of people who were not eligible for the funds.

While the restitution movements of the mid-1990s reunited some families with their stolen property, Holocaust remembrance also served as an important part of the reparation and restitution movement. The main idea of Holocaust remembrance comes from Dan Diner's article "Restitution and Memory: The Holocaust in European Political Cultures" which is the idea that Europe is now bound together by a collective memory of the Holocaust. This unified memory is one of the main reasons Diner lists for the flourishing of the restitution movement of the mid-1990s, following that of the initial movement immediately after World War II. This unified memory allowed for all European countries to come together after such a tragic event to establish the Holocaust at its center as one of the most damaging occurrences of the 20th century leading to a greater consciousness and awareness of this horrific event, in addition, to beginning countless discourses on the topic. Immediately after the Holocaust, countries such as the United States were preoccupied with the Cold War, whereas countries like Germany were controlled by foreign powers, and the Holocaust was not the main concern. Only as time went on did Europe begin to understand the importance of restitution and reparations. As the restoration of property increased, an increase in the memories for Holocaust survivors was found to be a direct correlation. The connection between property and memory proved to be a key in unlocking more details about the Holocaust, further adding to this collective European memory, and thereby increasing and furthering the restitution movement.

== Holocaust Memorial Days ==
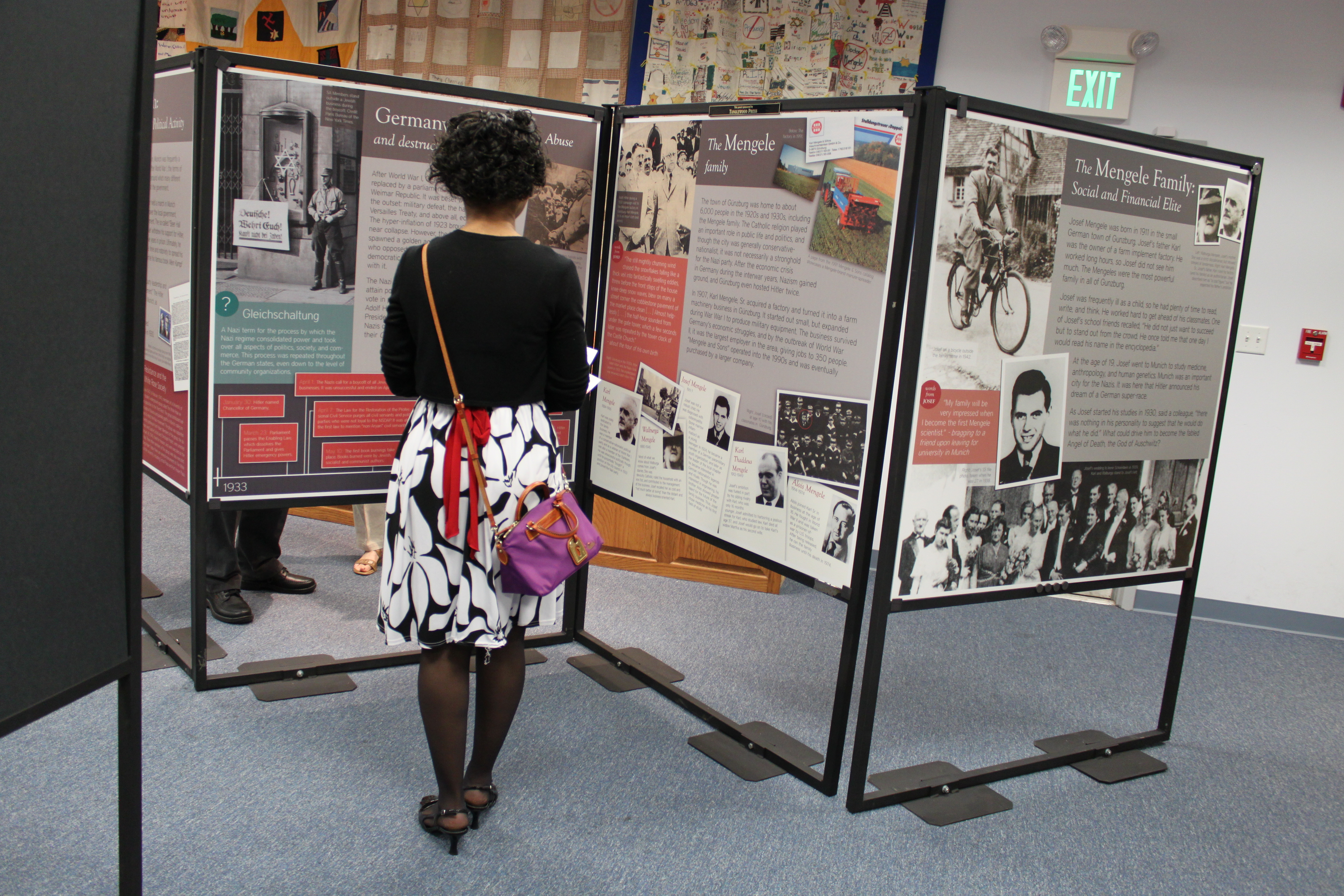
Days of Remembrance of the Victims of the Holocaust in Terre Haute, Indiana, 2011

The United Nations General Assembly voted on November 1, 2005, to designate January 27 as the "International Day of Commemoration in Memory of the Victims of the Holocaust." January 27, 1945, is the day that the former Nazi concentration and extermination camp of Auschwitz-Birkenau was liberated. The day had already been observed as Holocaust Memorial Day in a number of countries. Israel and the Jewish diaspora observe Yom HaShoah Ve-Hagvora, the "Day of Remembrance of the Holocaust and the courage of the Jewish people," on the 27th day of the Hebrew month of Nisan, which generally falls in April. Starting in 1979, the United States' equivalent commemoration is similarly timed to include the 27 Nisan date as well in a given year, beginning on the Sunday before the Gregorian calendar date that 27 Nisan falls on, and onward for a week to the following Sunday.

== Holocaust denial ==
Holocaust denial is the claim that the genocide of Jews during World War II–usually referred to as the Holocaust–did not occur in the manner and to the extent described by current scholars.

Key elements of this claim are the rejection of the following: that the Nazi government had a policy of deliberately targeting Jews and people of Jewish ancestry for extermination as a people; that between five and seven million Jews were systematically killed by the Nazis and their allies; and that genocide was carried out at extermination camps using tools of mass murder, such as gas chambers.

Many Holocaust deniers do not accept the term "denial" as an appropriate description of their point of view, and use the term Holocaust revisionism instead. Scholars, however, prefer the term "denial" to differentiate Holocaust deniers from historical revisionists, who use established historical methods.

Most Holocaust denial claims imply, or openly state, that the Holocaust is a hoax arising out of a deliberate Jewish conspiracy to advance the interest of Jews at the expense of other peoples. For this reason, Holocaust denial is generally considered to be an antisemitic conspiracy theory. The methods of Holocaust deniers are often criticized as based on a predetermined conclusion that ignores extensive historical evidence to the contrary. As of 2025, 17 European countries, (Note: Austria; Belgium; Czech Republic; France; Germany; Greece; Hungary; Italy; Lithuania; Luxembourg; Poland; Portugal; Romania; Russia; Slovakia; Switzerland; Ukraine) along with Canada and Israel, have laws in place that cover Holocaust denial as a punishable offence.

== Holocaust awareness ==
According to German-British journalist Alan Posener, the "...failure of German films and TV series to deal responsibly with the country's past and to appeal to younger audiences feeds a growing historical amnesia among young Germans. ... A September 2017 study conducted by the Körber Foundation found that 40 percent of 14-year-olds surveyed in Germany did not know what Auschwitz was."

A survey released on Holocaust Remembrance Day in April 2018 found that 41% of 1,350 American adults surveyed, and 66% of millennials, did not know what Auschwitz was. 41% of millennials incorrectly claimed that 2 million Jews or less were killed during the Holocaust, while 22% said they had never heard of the Holocaust. Over 95% of all Americans surveyed were unaware that the Holocaust occurred in the Baltic states of Latvia, Lithuania, and Estonia. 45% of adults and 49% of millennials were unable to name a single Nazi concentration camp or ghetto in German-occupied Europe during the Holocaust. In contrast, a study conducted in Israel has shown that young participants in social media use the Holocaust as a discursive means to critique and object Israel's current surveillance agenda.

== See also ==
- Kahanism
- Reparations Agreement between Israel and West Germany
- Secondary antisemitism
- Second-generation Holocaust Syndrome
- Silent Holocaust (Judaism)

Documentaries related to life after the Holocaust:

- The Boys of Buchenwald
- Marion's Triumph
- Luboml: My Heart Remembers
- Pola's March
