= Arline Geronimus =

American public health researcher

Arline T. Geronimus is an American public health researcher and a professor of Health Behavior & Health Education at the University of Michigan, as well as a research professor at the University of Michigan's Population Studies Center. Geronimus is known for proposing the weathering hypothesis in 1992, which posits that cumulative racism experienced by black women cause them to experience inferior birth outcomes as their maternal age increases. She has also studied other issues regarding pregnancy, including the effect of teenage childbearing on the mother's economic status and the effect of immigration enforcement raids on low birth weight. Since originating the weathering hypothesis, Geronimus has extended it to implications for health across the life course for men and women in a variety of culturally oppressed, marginalized, or economically exploited social identity groups in the United States. Geronimus' book, "WEATHERING: The Extraordinary Stress of Ordinary Life in an Unjust Society" was published by Little Brown in March 2023.

Geronimus received a Bachelor of Arts degree in politics (A.B., 1978) from Princeton University, and a Doctor of Science (Sc.D., 1985) in behavioral sciences from the Harvard University School of Public Health. She is a member of the National Academy of Medicine of the National Academies of Science.

== Book ==
Weathering: The Extraordinary Stress of Ordinary Life in an Unjust Society, 2023
