= Weathering hypothesis =

Sociological concept

Arline Geronimus wrote about the weathering hypothesis the early 1990s to account for health disparities of newborn babies and birth mothers due to decades and generations of racism and social, economic, and political oppression. It is well documented that people of color and other marginalized communities have worse health outcomes than white people. This is due to multiple stressors including prejudice, social alienation, institutional bias, political oppression, economic exclusion, and racial discrimination. The weathering hypothesis proposes that the cumulative burden of these stressors as individuals age is "weathering", and the increased weathering experienced by minority groups compared to others can account for differences in health outcomes. In recent years, social scientists investigated the biological plausibility of the weathering hypothesis in studies evaluating the physiological effects of social, environmental and political stressors among marginalized communities. The weathering hypothesis is more widely accepted as a framework for explaining health disparities on the basis of differential exposure to racially based stressors. Researchers have also identified patterns connecting weathering to biological phenomena associated with stress and aging, such as allostatic load, epigenetics, telomere shortening, and accelerated brain aging.

== Origins ==
The weathering hypothesis was initially formulated by Arline Geronimus to explain the dire maternal health and birth outcomes of African American women that she observed in correspondence with increased age. While working part-time at a school for pregnant teenagers in Trenton, New Jersey, Geronimus first noticed that the teens who came to the school tended to have far more health problems than her classmates at Princeton University. She thus began to wonder whether the health conditions of the teens at that clinic may have been caused by their environment. Subsequent research on the disparity in maternal health between African American and white women led Geronimus to propose the weathering hypothesis. She proposed that the accumulation of cultural, social and economic disadvantages may lead to earlier deterioration of health among African American women compared to their non-Hispanic, white counterparts. Geronimus specifically chose the term weathering as a metaphor for the effects she perceived that exposure to stress was having on the health of marginalized people. While the weathering hypothesis was initially proposed based on observations of patterns in maternal health, academics have expanded its application as a framework to examine other health disparities as well.

=== Geronimus' research ===
While conducting research in the Department of Public Health Policy and Administration as a graduate student at the University of Michigan in 1992, Geronimus noticed a trend in disparities between the fertility of African American women versus White women. She noted that, on average, White girls and women experience their highest fertility rates and lowest risk of pregnancy complications or neonatal mortality in their 20's and 30's, but African American women do not. Instead, African American girls and women, teenagers have higher fertility rates and healthy pregnancies. The data indicated a widening disparity in black-white infant mortality as maternal ages increase. Subsequently, Geronimus proposed the "weathering hypothesis", which she initially conceived as a potential explanation for the patterns of racial variation in infant mortality with increasing maternal age.

== Health disparities ==
In the context of the weathering hypothesis, individual health is dynamic and shaped over time by social, economic, and environmental influences. These social determinants dictate what different demographics are exposed to as they develop and age. Racism and discrimination are two specific social determinants that lay the foundation for systemic inequality in access and upward mobility. This entrenchment of social inequities disproportionately impacts minorities and communities of color, who remain in environments of poverty that have significantly more stressors than those of wealthier, predominantly white communities. These stressors—and the associated burden of coping with them—manifest as physiological responses that have detrimental effects on individual health, often leading to a disproportionately high occurrence of chronic illness and shorter life expectancy in minority communities. Multiethnic studies have yielded significant data demonstrating that weathering—accumulated health risk due to social, economic and environmental stressors—is a manifestation of social stratification that systemically influences disparities in health and mortality between dominant and minority communities.

=== Maternal health ===
Maternal mortality is three to four times higher for Black mothers than white mothers in the United States. Infant mortality is also twice as high for infants born to non-Hispanic Black mothers compared to infants born to non-Hispanic white mothers. Additionally, there are racial disparities for negative birth outcomes like low birth weight, which has been found to influence risk of infant mortality and developmental outcomes after birth, and preterm birth. Across all women, older maternal age is associated with higher rates of these negative outcomes during pregnancy, but studies have consistently found that rates rise more rapidly for Black women than white women. The weathering hypothesis proposes that the accumulation of racial stress over Black women's lives contributes to this observed pattern of racial disparities in maternal health and birth outcomes that increase with maternal age. Research has consistently identified an association between preterm birth and low birth weight in Black women and maternal stress caused by experiences of racism, systemic bias, socioeconomic disadvantage, segregated neighborhoods, and high rates of violent crime. There is biological evidence of weathering, including the finding that Black women have shorter telomeres, a biological indicator of age, when compared with white women of the same chronological age. Though increased socioeconomic status serves as a protective factor against negative birth outcomes for non-Hispanic white mothers, disproportionate rates of preterm birth and low birth weight for non-Hispanic Black mothers have been found at every education and income level. The weathering hypothesis has also been used to explain this trend because upward socioeconomic mobility is associated with increased exposure to discrimination for women of color.

There is modest evidence supporting the effects of weathering on mothers from other minority groups, including for high birth weight outcomes among American Indian/Alaska Native women. Research has started to explore whether the weathering hypothesis could also explain racial disparities in the outcomes of assisted reproductive technologies, but so far the findings are inconsistent.

=== Mental health ===
Research shows that mental health disparities among marginalized communities exist. Daily discrimination faced by marginalized groups have been found to be associated with increased depressive symptoms and feelings of loneliness. Low-income communities are more likely to have severe mental illnesses, which is frequently heightened by the inaccessibility to quality healthcare. Researchers found that persisting epigenetic changes lead to increased risk of postpartum depression as a result of adverse life events and cumulative life stress among Black, Latinx, and low-income women. In a study assessing African American men, experiences of racism were linked to a poorer mental health state.

=== Cognition ===
Black Americans often show mean level differences in cognition across multiple cognitive domains compared to non-Hispanic Whites. These cognitive disparities often are reduced or eliminated when factoring various social determinants of health such as stress, education quality, economic stability, or quality of healthcare. Black Americans also have higher rates of Alzheimer's disease and related dementias than non-Hispanic Whites. These higher rates of Alzheimer's disease might be due to the impact of more negative and pronounced social determinants of health, including racial discrimination, that might accelerate brain aging disproportionately in Black Americans.

=== Intersectionality of systems of oppression ===
Intersectionality is a term coined by Kimberlé Crenshaw to describe the interconnected nature of different systems of oppression, the layered effects of which can be seen in the healthcare system. Research indicates that lower class status and increased depressive symptoms are associated with higher levels of biological weathering among Black individuals in comparison to white individuals. In a study exploring disparities in mental health, researchers found that Black sexual minority women reported higher frequencies of discrimination and decreased levels of social and psychological well-being than their white sexual minority women counterparts. Black sexual minority women had decreased levels of social well-being and increased levels of depressive symptoms in comparison to Black sexual minority men. African American women are also more likely to contract COVID-19 than African American men and white women. The prevalence of medical racism and sexism (lack of quality healthcare, harmful experimentation, etc.) has led to negative relationships with healthcare systems and increased risk of negative sexual and reproductive health outcomes among African American women. Existing research show how systems of oppression work together to oppress marginalized groups within the healthcare system and, as a result, these groups disproportionately experience negative health effects. Aging adults experience further intersections with health, health care, and structural inequalities that exacerbates health in marginalized groups.

== Criticism and related theories ==
Arline Geronimus faced significant pushback for the weathering hypothesis from the medical community, economists, and sociologists, whose research had attributed racial differences in health outcomes to differing genetics, cultures, and life choices. Additionally, there was criticism regarding the quality of her data. Others pushed back against the weathering hypothesis because its application to racial disparities in maternal health seemed to contradict what advocacy groups had been saying about the negative consequences of teen pregnancy on young mothers. A further criticism of this theory believes that Geronimus and others have not sufficiently demonstrated a link between weathering and racial and gender disparities in life expectancy.

The weathering hypothesis was initially proposed as a sociological explanation for health disparities, but it is closely related to biological theories like the allostatic load model, which proposes that an individual's exposure to repeated or chronic stress over their lifetime has physiological consequences which can be measured through various biomarkers. Research has tended to discuss allostasis and allostatic load as the molecular mechanism behind the weathering hypothesis, and Geronimus herself went on to study racial differences in allostatic load. Another related theory is the life course approach, which emphasizes focus on cumulative life experiences rather than maternal risk factors as an explanation for birth outcome disparities. Researchers have also been interested in studying the possibility of children inheriting the epigenetic changes which result from their mother's cumulative life stress, which could relate the weathering hypothesis with transgenerational trauma.

== See also ==
- Allostatic load
- Adverse childhood experiences
- African Americans § Health
- Gender disparities in health
- Health equity
- Healthcare and the LGBT community
- Inequality in disease
- John Henryism
- Minority stress
- Post Traumatic Slave Syndrome
- Race and health
  - Race and health in the United States
- Robert Sapolsky Research on Stress
- Seasoning (slavery)
- Slave health on plantations in the United States
- Slavery hypertension hypothesis
- Whitehall Study
