= John Henryism =

Strategy for coping with prolonged exposure to stress

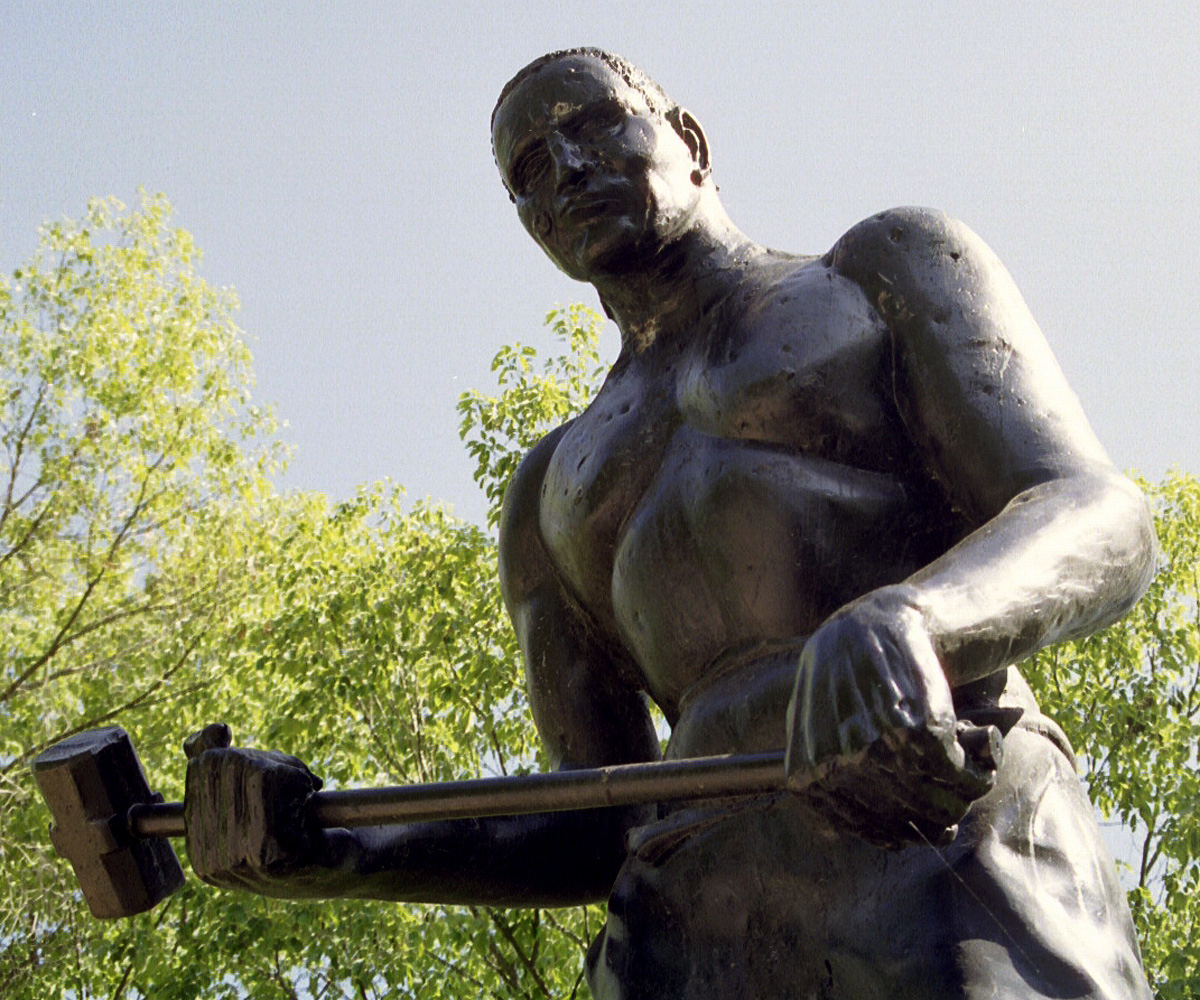
Statue of John Henry outside the town of Talcott in Summers County, West Virginia

John Henryism is a strategy for coping with prolonged exposure to stresses such as social discrimination by expending high levels of effort, which results in accumulating physiological costs.

== Origins ==
The term was conceived in the 1970s by African-American epidemiologist and public health researcher Sherman James while he was investigating racial health disparities between Black people and others in North Carolina.

One of the people he interviewed was a Black man, who, despite being born into an impoverished sharecropper family and having only a second grade education, could read and write. The man had freed himself and his children from the sharecropper system, had 75 acres (30 ha) of farmed land by age 40, but by his 50s, he had hypertension, arthritis, and severe peptic ulcer disease.

His name, John Henry Martin, and his circumstances were evocative of folk hero John Henry, an African American who worked vigorously enough to compete successfully with a steam-powered machine but died as a result of his effort.

== Description ==
James's hypothesis was that African Americans sometimes attempted to control their environment through similar attempts at superhuman performance, which may involve working harder at the office or working longer hours to prove one's worth.

James developed a 12-item scale called "The John Henryism Scale for Active Coping" or JHAC12 for measuring this strategy.

The three themes that were deemed important in measuring John Henryism were:

- efficacious mental and physical vigor
- a strong commitment to hard work
- a single-minded determination to succeed

The scale developed for measuring John Henryism was based on agreement with a series of statements such as these:

- "When things don't go the way I want them to, that just makes me work even harder"
- "I've always felt that I could make of my life pretty much what I wanted to make of it."

In his seminal 1983 study, 132 Southern, working-class Black men between the ages of 17 and 60 years were administered the John Henryism scale. The scale was used to measure the extent to which these men believed that they could control their environment through hard work and determination. In accordance with the author's hypothesis, subjects who scored low on educational variables and high on John Henryism had significantly higher levels of diastolic blood pressure than those who scored above the median on both measures. James believed that educational achievement and the John Henryism construct score may have a positive correlation with autonomic arousal in African Americans when these individuals have encounters with everyday stressors.

== Effects ==
Men who scored higher on the John Henryism scale were not found to have statistically significant differences in mean systolic blood pressure or mean diastolic blood pressure when compared to their lower-scoring counterparts. However, a significant effect did emerge in the variation of the percentage of hypertension. Those who were categorized as low or medium socioeconomic status (SES) and had high levels of John Henryism had a significantly higher percentage of hypertension than their counterparts with low levels of John Henryism. However, high-SES men with high levels of John Henryism were found to have lower levels of hypertension than their low–John Henryism, high-SES counterparts.

African Americans with high John Henryism scores were less likely to be current or former smokers than those with low scores. African-American college students with high John Henryism scores were less likely to have carried a weapon on campus for self-defense, more likely to have been arrested for driving under the influence, and more likely to have missed a class due to alcohol use.

== See also ==
- Allostatic load
- Intergroup anxiety
- Magical Negro
- Masking (behavior)
- Minority stress
- Model minority
- Overachievement
- Psychoneuroimmunology
- Pyrrhic victory
- Slavery hypertension hypothesis
- Stakhanovite movement
- Stereotype threat
- Stress (biology)
- Type A and Type B personality theory
- Weathering hypothesis
