= Race and maternal health in the United States =

Maternal health outcomes differ significantly between racial groups within the United States. The American College of Obstetricians and Gynecologists describes these disparities in obstetric outcomes as "prevalent and persistent." Black, indigenous, and people of color are disproportionately affected by many of the maternal health outcomes listed as national objectives in the U.S. Department of Health and Human Services's national health objectives program, Healthy People 2030. The American Public Health Association considers maternal mortality to be a human rights issue, also noting the disparate rates of Black maternal death. Race affects maternal health throughout the pregnancy continuum, beginning prior to conception and continuing through pregnancy (antepartum), during labor and childbirth (intrapartum), and after birth (postpartum).

There are multiple explanations for racial disparities in maternal health. Biological factors, such as higher rates of preexisting chronic disease prior to pregnancy, fail to fully account for differences in outcomes. There is a lack of evidence to support a genetic difference between racial groups as a cause of maternal health disparities such as preterm birth. Social factors, such as structural racism, have been suggested as a contributory cause of the wide racial disparities in maternal health in the United States. Experiences of racism and discrimination may also contribute to hypertension indirectly through stress on the pregnant individual. Disparities in adverse pregnancy outcomes for Black women have been hypothesized to be related to higher loads of allostatic stress before and during pregnancy, epigenetic changes, and/or telomere shortening. Studies of potential biomarkers of allostatic stress have failed to date to demonstrate the racial group differences seen with self-report measures. Inequities in access and the provision of health care may also effect maternal outcomes. The effects of implicit and explicit provider bias in obstetrical care has been poorly studied and may contribute to disparate outcomes. The information health care providers share and how that information is presented affects the autonomy and decision-making of birthing women.

Proposed interventions to reduce racial disparities in maternal health outcomes target changes at individual, health care system, and health care policy levels. Some states are utilizing federal block grant money for initiatives targeting reductions in maternal morbidity and mortality for Black and Hispanic women. Efforts have been made to address racial inequalities for birthing women by providing continuing education for healthcare providers. Measurement, methodological, and ethical issues arise when using race in health outcomes research. Recommendations for appropriate use of race as a research variable may limit use of white normative standards in the future, which can imply non-white people as being atypical. Proposed alternative variables for race may be genetic ancestry, socioeconomic factors, or differential opportunities.

== Preconception ==
=== Unintended pregnancy ===
Overall, approximately 50% of pregnancies in the United States are unplanned, however Black and Hispanic women are more likely to have unplanned pregnancy than white women. Unintended pregnancies are associated with increased risk of delayed entry into prenatal care, decreased rates of breastfeeding after birth, increased risk of maternal depression, and increased risk of domestic abuse. The cost of unintended pregnancy in the United States exceeded $20 billion in 2010.

=== Social determinants of health ===
==== Environment ====
While limited research is available about the reproductive system effects of environmental pollutants, evidence from animal models indicates risks to humans. Black families are more likely to live in neighborhoods with poorer air quality and higher rates of heavy metal contaminants. Air pollution has been associated with increased risk of preterm birth. Heavy metals such as lead and mercury are known neurotoxins and the developing fetal nervous system may be particularly vulnerable to excessive levels. Exposure to organic pollutants prior to conception is linked to lower birth weight in infants. One study of pesticide use in New York found the highest rate of exposure in Black women; pesticide exposure in pregnancy is associated with low birth weight and smaller head circumference. The correlation between pesticide and pollutants on fetal growth restriction seen in Black women in New York City was not demonstrated among Dominican women living in the same neighborhoods, suggesting there may be a cultural modifier.

==== Economic status ====
Strategies to improve pregnancy outcomes through behavioral interventions like folic acid supplementation and smoking cessation may be too little too late, as many women enter prenatal care several weeks into sensitive fetal development. Optimizing preconception health is recommended by several professional organizations to optimize maternal health prior to pregnancy, particularly for women with chronic diseases. Low income women, however, are less likely to have access to preconception and preventive health care. In general, financial disadvantages heavily impact an expecting mother’s risk for adverse outcomes at birth. Racial disparities in poverty adversely effect Black and Hispanic families.

=== Chronic health conditions ===
Chronic hypertension prior to and during pregnancy is associated with increased risk of preeclampsia, eclampsia, placental abruption, stroke, cardiomyopathy, heart failure, pulmonary edema, renal failure, and maternal death. Black women are more than twice as likely as white women to be diagnosed with chronic hypertension. Black, Asian, and Pacific Islander women are more likely to have chronic hypertension that necessitates preterm delivery than white women.

While less than 1% of births in the United States are effected by preexisting maternal diabetes, uncontrolled glycemic levels prior to and during pregnancy are associated with increased risk of congenital anomalies, preeclampsia, macrosomia, Cesarean birth, preterm birth, and stillbirth. Even after adjusting for risk factors such as smoking, socioeconomic status, years of education, and body mass index (BMI), Black and Hispanic people have higher risk of developing diabetes than their white counterparts. Asian people are also at higher risk of diabetes compared to white people, and subgroup analysis indicates that those who identify as South Asian (Indian, Pakistani, Sri Lankan, Bangladeshi, Nepali, or Bhutanese) have the highest prevalence of diabetes. Evidence also suggests that Hispanic and Asian people are more likely to have undiagnosed diabetes and that Asian people are more likely to be diagnosed with diabetes at lower BMIs than other racial groups.

Samoan, Hawaiian, Native American, Alaskan Native, Black, Mexican, Puerto Rican, Central American, and South American women are at higher risk of pre-pregnancy obesity. Women with BMI greater than 40 during pregnancy are at increased risk for fetal cardiac defects and comorbidities such as hypertension, hyperlipidemia, and obstructive sleep apnea.

== Antepartum ==
=== Prenatal care ===
Black, Hispanic and Native American women are more likely to have late entry to prenatal care than white women. One study found that Asian women under the age of 18 years old were the most likely to start prenatal care after the first trimester. Black women are more likely to have less than five prenatal visits, which is associated with increased risk of maternal mortality. Late entry to prenatal care and inadequate prenatal care are associated with increased likelihood of preterm birth, increased risk of low birthweight infants, and increased infant mortality. Many of the quality measures included in indices of prenatal care lack established correlations to improved maternal health outcomes.

Black, Hispanic and Native American women are more likely to report site-related barriers to receiving prenatal care, such as distance to the clinic and lack of transportation to appointments. Black women are also more likely to report inconvenience as a barrier to care, such as longer appointment wait times.

=== Pregnancy loss ===
Early pregnancy loss, miscarriage before the end of the 20th week of gestation, occurs in approximately 10-15% of all clinically confirmed pregnancies. Racial differences in miscarriages between Black and white women are not seen in early pregnancy prior to 10 weeks estimated gestational age, however Black women are almost twice as likely as white women to experience pregnancy loss between 10 and 20 weeks estimated gestational age. The Weathering Hypothesis, first described by Arline Geronimus, has been proposed as the neuroendocrine immune pathway by which Black women experience this higher rate of early pregnancy loss.

Racial disparities in pregnancy loss after the completion of 20 weeks of gestation, or stillbirth, have been documented in the United States since at least as early as 1918. Despite an overall decreasing rate of stillbirth nationally, Black women remain twice as likely as white women to experience fetal death. This disparity persists after adjusting for sociodemographic and maternal health factors, suggesting that social factors, such as housing segregation, may play a role. Stillbirth risks for Hispanic, Native American, and Alaskan Native women are higher than for white women, although not to the same extent as Black women. Asian and Pacific Islander women have approximately the same risk of stillbirth as white women.

=== Medical conditions in pregnancy ===
Black women are more likely than white women to have anemia during pregnancy, which has been associated with low birth weight infants, preterm birth, or both in some studies. Racial disparities in incidence of anemia in pregnancy persist across socioeconomic groups.

Asian women are more likely to be diagnosed with gestational diabetes during pregnancy than white women, regardless of BMI. Studies of gestational diabetes often fail to distinguish between subgroups of Asian women or differentiate Pacific Islander women, however one study found that while Pacific Islander women were at increased risk of gestational diabetes compared to white women, their risk was less than that of Asian women. While racial and ethnic groups including Hispanic, Native American, African, and Australian Aboriginal women are often reported to be at increased risk of developing gestational diabetes, racial disparities could be succinctly summarized as increased risk for women who identify as non-white.

Black women are at increased risk of preeclampsia, a finding that is not fully explained by the increased incidence of chronic hypertension in that population. Compared to other racial groups, Black women are also more likely to have serious complications of pre-eclampsia such as eclampsia, stroke, acute heart failure, pulmonary edema, and renal failure. The increased incidence of preeclampsia in Black women seems to have a social or cultural component, as Black women born outside the United States and residing within the US for less than 10 years have a significantly less likelihood of developing pre-eclampsia than Black women born and living in the US. After more than 10 years of living in the US this group difference based on place of birth is not significant. Black women with preeclampsia are also more likely to have stillbirth than similar white women, while Hispanic women with preeclampsia do not have increased risk compared to similar white women.

== Intrapartum ==
=== Preterm birth ===
Black women in the United States are more likely than white women to give birth preterm, defined as less than 37 weeks estimated gestational age. This racial disparity is persistent for Black women across all levels of education, income, and insurance status. Systemic racism likely plays a role in this increased risk for Black women, as evidenced by the finding that preterm birth disparities by race are higher in areas where more unarmed Black people are killed by police. One study found that from 1971 to 2018 Black women were twice as likely to have given birth prematurely than white women. During that same time, Black women were also more likely than white women to give birth extremely premature, defined as less than 28 weeks estimated gestational age. The cost of preterm births in the US in 2016 exceeded $25 billion. According to a recent study in the United States, black women are 50 percent more likely to experience preterm birth than white women and bout 14 percent of black babies are born premature, compared with just over 9 percent of white and Hispanic babies.

=== Maternal experience of labor and birth ===
Surveys of women after childbirth find that Black women are more likely than Hispanic or white non-Hispanic women to report having been treated poorly in the hospital due to their race, ethnicity, language or culture. Women of color are more likely to report mistreatment during childbirth, with Indigenous women more likely to describe mistreatment than either Black or Hispanic women. Paternal race is also a risk factor for mistreatment during childbirth as white women with a Black partner are twice as likely as white women with a white partner to report mistreatment.

Hispanic women are less likely than either Black or white women to receive epidural analgesia in labor, however it is unclear if the disparity is due to patient preference.

Hispanic women are more likely to report feeling overwhelmed during childbirth compared to white or Black women.

=== Mode of birth ===
Black women are 40% more likely to birth by Cesarean than white women after controlling for social, economic, medical, and hospital factors. In addition, Black women have higher rates of Cesarean birth than American Indian, Alaskan Native, Asian, Native Hawaiian, Pacific Islander, or multiracial women. Native American and Alaskan Native women have the lowest rates of Cesarean birth while Asian women have higher rates of Cesarean birth than all racial groups except Black women.

Racial disparities are also apparent in indications for Cesarean birth. An analysis of births in Hawaii found that Micronesian women were more likely than white women to have a Cesarean birth for provider-subjective indications, such as non-reassuring fetal heart tones or labor dystocia. Similarly, Black women are more likely to have a Cesarean birth for fetal distress or "other" indication than white women.

Hispanic and Black women with previous Cesarean birth are less likely than white women to birth vaginally with subsequent pregnancies, a disparity which persisted after adjustment for obstetric, anthropometric, and demographic factors. Repeat Cesarean birth is associated with greater maternal morbidity than vaginal birth and national guidelines support informed decision making for women desiring vaginal birth after Cesarean (VBAC). Use of race to predict successful VBAC has been criticized as perpetuating racial disparities in mode of birth.

Perineal lacerations frequently occur during vaginal birth, however Asian women are more likely than women of other racial groups to experience perineal trauma. Asian and Pacific Islander women are also more likely to experience third and fourth degree perineal lacerations during birth. Compared to white women, Black women are less likely to experience perineal lacerations.

=== Severe maternal morbidity ===
Asian and Hispanic women are at disparate risk of postpartum hemorrhage due to uterine atony compared to other women. Black women are more likely than white women to have severe maternal morbidity related to postpartum hemorrhage. Black, Asian, and Pacific Islander women are at increased risk of hysterectomy due to postpartum hemorrhage compared to white or Hispanic women

Cardiovascular severe maternal morbidity encompasses pre-existing conditions, such as valvular heart disease, and pregnancy-related conditions, such as pre-eclampsia and peripartum cardiomyopathy. Black women are approximately twice as likely as white women and 1.5 times more likely than Hispanic women to be affected by cardiovascular maternal morbidity.

=== Maternal mortality ===
Black women have 3.4 times the risk of maternal death from pregnancy complications compared to white women. Black women over 40 years old have the highest risk of pregnancy-related deaths of any group, at 192 deaths per 100,000 live births. Cardiomyopathy, thrombotic pulmonary embolism, and hypertensive disorders of pregnancy accounted for disproportionately more maternal deaths for Black women then white women. Black women are more likely to die from postpartum hemorrhage than women from other racial groups. Disparities in Black maternal mortality persist across all levels of education. American Indian and Native Alaskan women also have a disparate risk of death from pregnancy-related complications that is 2.3 times the risk of white women. American Indian and Native Alaskan women were more likely to die from infection and hypertensive disorders of pregnancy than white women.

== Postpartum care ==
Black and Hispanic women are more likely than white women to report moderate to severe pain postpartum and less likely to receive prescriptions for opioids upon discharge. Medical professionals are less likely to listen to the concerns of pregnant African American women, which leads to them feeling less comfortable with the staff or discouraged to speak up. Sadly, this is something that occurs often around the country. Those who speak out their concerns are ignored and later die due to complications that could have been prevented. Which in turn leaves the child without their mother. It is a concern that happens more often than it should and greatly affects Black women more than their white counterparts. For example, 23 grand slam winner Serena Williams almost lost her life due to post-birth complications that the medical staff ignored. She knew something was wrong with her body but the staff dismissed her concerns and said she was confused. Williams continued to insist that something was wrong and they finally did a full check up on her body. It was revealed that she had several blood clots and during a surgery a hemorrhage was discovered. Black women continue to be deprived of the care they so desperately need. During the COVID-19 pandemic, new Black mothers showed signs of lagging adaption to the changing healthcare system which resulted in an increase in postpartum complications. Black women are at increased risk of hospital readmission in the first 30 days after giving birth compared to white and Hispanic women. Preeclampsia is also associated with greater likelihood of postpartum hospital readmission; Black women are at disparate risk of developing pre-eclampsia.

Study findings of associations between self identification as Black or Hispanic and postpartum depression are mixed. The experience of postpartum depression in women of color is likely complicated by discrimination, increased risk of adversities such as poverty, and decreased access to resources. Native American women are at increased risk of postpartum depression compared to white women.

Research on attendance of outpatient postpartum follow up visits and ongoing home care is mixed. Some studies have found that Native American and Black women are less likely than white women to attend postpartum visits, while other research has found no racial differences. Women's past experiences of racial discrimination and mistreatment over the course of pregnancy and birth, as well as system barriers such as returning to work, limited transportation, and access to insurance coverage, likely dissuade women from attending postpartum appointments.

=== Contraception and Sterilization ===
Review of characteristics of women who received bilateral tubal ligation at the time of Cesarean birth shows Black women and women with Medicaid are more likely to undergo sterilization postpartum. Provider bias in contraceptive counseling may influence women's choice of postpartum contraception, with Black and Hispanic women being more likely than white women to have long-acting reversible contraception recommended. Black and Hispanic women have also reported experiencing coercion in postpartum contraceptive counseling. Historically, involuntary sterilization has targeted limiting the reproduction of minority women. While legislative changes have outlawed compulsory sterilization in the United States, reports of coersion and unwanted sterilization among incarcerated and immigrant women continue.

=== Breastfeeding ===
Initiation of breastfeeding, duration, and exclusivity of breastfeeding at 3 and 6 months shows significant racial disparities, with Black infants less likely to receive breastmilk than white infants. Black women are twice as likely to receive formula samples after birth than white women, which may undermine breastfeeding efforts. Native American infants are also less likely to be breastfed than white infants. Since 2014 all Indian Health Service obstetric facilities are designated as Baby-Friendly in order to address this disparity. Likely historical oppression and racist practices contribute to decreased breastfeeding rates in Black and Native American communities.
