= Seasoning (slavery) =

Period of adjustment of African slaves in the Americas

Seasoning, or the Seasoning, was the period of adjustment that slave traders and slaveholders subjected enslaved African people to following their arrival in the Americas. While modern scholarship has occasionally applied this term to the brief period of acclimatization undergone by European immigrants to the Americas, it most frequently and formally referred to the process undergone by enslaved people. Slave traders used the term "seasoning" to refer to the process of adjusting the enslaved Africans to the new climate, diet, geography, and ecology of the Americas. The term applied to both the physical acclimatization of the enslaved person to the environment and that person's adjustment to a new social environment, labor regimen, and language. Slave traders and owners believed that if slaves survived this critical period of environmental seasoning, they were less likely to die and the psychological element would make them more easily controlled. This process took place immediately after the arrival of enslaved people, during which their mortality rates were particularly high. These "new", or "saltwater", slaves were described as "outlandish" on arrival. Those who survived this process became "seasoned" and typically commanded a higher price in the market. For example, in eighteenth century Brazil, the price differential between "new" and "seasoned" slaves was about fifteen percent.

== Regional variance ==
Atlantic Creoles made up the first generations of enslaved people. Atlantic creoles were often mixed-race, integrated into and familiar with European society and gained freedom at higher rates prior to the eighteenth century. The first half of the 18th century saw a shift in Atlantic slavery. While tobacco, sugar, and rice took root in the Caribbean and North American colonies, the enslaved population of the New World shifted from a "society with slaves" to a "slave society" with the predominance of "saltwater slavery" -- enslavement through the Atlantic slave trade. With the expansion of the slave trade in the mid-eighteenth century, the nature of slavery changed. Operating on a larger scale, slave traders transported enslaved Africans to various European colonies throughout the Americas (both before and after the decolonization of the Americas), systematizing both the voyage and the process of seasoning, though it varied locationally and temporally. While slave traders and owners practiced seasoning in both North and South America, it was not practiced consistently in the Southern Colonies where planters often forced "new" slaves to work immediately upon their arrival to the colonies.

Slave traders and slaveowners adopted the term "seasoning" during the transatlantic slave trade when newly arrived slaves died at high rates in the years following disembarkation. Death rates differed among regions in the Americas, though both the Middle Passage and the seasoning period were exceptionally deadly across the Americas. A "Dr. Collins" writing in 1803 attributed the high mortality rates to disease, change in climate, diet, labor, "severity", and suicide. In the Thirteen Colonies, death rates during seasoning were at an estimated 25 to 50 percent. In Cuba, deaths in a single year were between 7 and 12 percent while the mortality rate reached as high as 33 percent in Jamaica. In Brazil, an estimated 25 percent of enslaved people died during the seasoning process, where the law also required that slaves be baptized during their first year in the country.

== Diet ==
A contemporary observer noted that seasoning was a "training not only to hard work, but to scanty diet." Slaveowners drastically limited the slaves' diets, both in breadth and depth, to the diet of the plantations, which was chiefly composed of maize, rice, or flour. Battered by this inadequate diet, enslaved people often suffered "dropsies" (edema) and "fluxes" (diarrhea), compounding their severe and widespread malnutrition.

== Disease ==
Newly arrived slaves experienced high rates of disease and death during the seasoning process. During the Middle Passage, slave traders forced enslaved Africans to live in tight quarters without ventilation, sufficient food, or water, and with no opportunity for hygiene. In such conditions, enslaved people often contracted scurvy or amoebic dysentery; of which amoebic dysentery, or the "bloody flux", claimed the most lives. Once ashore, enslaved people lived in appalling conditions similar to those of the Middle Passage. Underfed and exposed to a new ecology, enslaved people then had to battle the new climate and forced hard labor. Weakened by the voyage and immediate brutality of slavery, many enslaved people died of smallpox, measles, influenza, and unidentified diseases at high rates in the first several years after arrival.

== Labor and violence ==
Though it took many different forms, seasoning universally involved the further commodification of human beings and their preparation by enslavers for the marketplace and labor. Enslavers accomplished this preparation by treating their slaves harshly, subjecting them to a brutal regimen of training and violence. Lasting between one and three years, this process of adjustment was physically and psychologically taxing, and marked by brutality and coercion. Slaveholders resorted to force and violence in order to subdue the "saltwater" slaves and extract their labor. Enslavers regularly beat slaves, maimed them, and placed them in stocks or solitary confinement. In one particularly cruel practice, the slaveholder would whip a naked woman, often pregnant, and pour salt, pepper, or wax into her open wounds. In addition to violence, enslaved people had to adjust to hard labor over the seasoning period. In the Caribbean, newly arrived slaves were given baskets for fertilizing the sugar fields the week they arrived. This was the first step in the essential process of training the new arrivals in the technologies of sugar cultivation. Elsewhere, too, enslaved people were taught how to cultivate and process crops, often including the ones meant to sustain the enslaved population during the seasoning. Over the seasoning period, slaveowners wanted their slaves to acquire both knowledge of the labor and to become accustomed to the extreme workload. Training did not only take the form of labor. Enslaved people were also taught the language of the colony either by other slaves who had already undergone the seasoning process or by the white overseers of the plantation.

== Resistance ==
Though constantly threatened with beatings and further ill-treatment, enslaved people resisted their enslavement in the seasoning in several visible ways. Scholars have considered widespread suicide among newly enslaved people an act of resistance. Indeed, enslavers feared suicide alongside disease, and contemporary manuals for the seasoning included recommendations for improving an enslaved person's "disposition" to best avoid suicide. Hunger plagued enslaved people during and after the seasoning and reports of food theft at any opportunity -- and the beatings from enslavers that followed such thefts -- were common. Still others refused to eat entirely and were similarly punished. Runaway attempts were common, though these recently enslaved arrivals rarely escaped successfully, as they had little familiarity with their surroundings and were isolated on the major plantations of the Americas.

== See also ==
- Biography and the Black Atlantic
- Malaria in the Caribbean
- Black ladino
- Middle Passage
- Slavery in the British and French Caribbean
- Slave health on plantations in the United States
- Slavery hypertension hypothesis
- Weathering hypothesis

== Bibliography ==
- Collins (1803). Practical Rules for the Management and Medical Treatment of Negro Slaves, in the Sugar Colonies. London: King's College London.
- Gomez, Michael A. (1998). Exchanging Our Country Marks: The Transformation of African Identities in the Colonial and Antebellum South. Chapel Hill: University of North Carolina Press.
- Kiple, Kenneth F. (2002). The Caribbean Slave: A Biological History. Cambridge: Cambridge University Press. ISBN 0521268745.
- Meltzer, Milton (1993). Slavery: A World History. Boston: Da Capo Press. ISBN 978-0-306-80536-3.
- Mullin, Michael (1992). Africa in America: Slave Acculturation and Resistance in the American South and the British Caribbean, 1736-1831. Urbana and Chicago: University of Illinois Press.
- Schwartz, Stuart B. (1985). Sugar Plantations in the Formation of Brazilian Society: Bahia, 1550-1835. Cambridge: Cambridge University Press.
