= Second-generation Holocaust syndrome =

Effects of Holocaust on children of survivors

Generational Holocaust syndromes are a form of transgenerational trauma due to the effects of the Holocaust on the children and grandchildren of survivors. Effects are reported to include a sense of connection to family histories, sense of exclusion, and political and ethical values. Some studies have found that generational effects are dissipated in the third generation. Higher vulnerability to stress is also noted. Stresses are related to survival issues, lack of emotional resources, and coercion to please the parents and satisfy their needs.

== Effects ==
Children often had difficulty expressing normal adolescent anger toward their parents: "The parents had to suppress their own rage during the Holocaust and were afforded few opportunities after to vent it; the children later experienced their own normal aggressive instincts as overwhelming."

While research has shown the effects to be present in the children of survivors, there has been less evidence to support the effects being present within grandchildren. Though Fossion et al. in a 2003 study found that the grandchildren of Holocaust survivors were overrepresented by 300% among the referrals to a psychiatry clinic in comparison with their representation in the general population.

Some of the trauma response of survivors are thought to have harmful effects on their children's personality and worldview as well as on their interpersonal and religious relations. With such effects then potentially impacting the children in the third generation, due to the strategies employed by the second generation to cope.

Survivor Henia Bryer commented that reading about second- and third-generation Holocaust syndrome, as well as observations of family friends, influenced her to minimize her discussion of the ghetto and camps with her own children. "Children tend to be very protective about their parents, and I didn't want them to feel they should treat me differently because I went through all these things, and I didn’t want to treat them differently." Bryer said a typical observation was parents pressuring a child to finish meals because they had starved in the camps. Worries about feeding are commonly found in the research: "parents who had survived starvation worrying about feeding their children as if it were a matter of life and death, and many examples of the later development of eating disorders among daughters of survivors."

In discussing her mother's biography, Rita Goldberg commented that she felt she lacked the survival qualities of her parents, and her sisters and she were afraid to acknowledge anger or anxiety, because "those emotions felt somehow unworthy." She felt she could never do as much with her life: "We were measured against our grandparents' martyrdom on the one hand and our parents' exceptional courage on the other. And we failed abjectly to live up to that sublime standard."

In comparative research conducted, it was found that having two survivor parents resulted in higher mental health problems compared to having one survivor parent. It was also found among survivor parents that a Post-Traumatic Stress Disorder (PTSD) diagnosed in the mother correlated with a higher likelihood of a PTSD diagnosis in the children, while a diagnosis in the father correlated with a higher likelihood of depressive disorders in the children.

== History ==
In 1966, psychologists began to observe large numbers of children of Holocaust survivors seeking mental help in clinics in Canada.

In an overview of the study of survivors' children, Anne Karpf places its onset in the early 1960s: "Canadian psychiatrist, Vivian Rakoff, noticed that he was seeing more adolescents whose parents were Holocaust survivors than he would have expected, and wrote an article giving three case studies." By the late 1970s, it was an established field of study:

"It wasn't long, however, before children of Holocaust survivors were graced with a syndrome all of their own, and a torrent of academic papers to herald its arrival. They drew attention to disturbances in the parent–child relationship, suggesting that the offspring of people who’d experienced overwhelming physical and mental trauma might themselves manifest some of their parents' trauma."

== Academic influence ==
The view that parents transmit trauma to their children underlies many theories of transgenerational trauma.

Studies of the children of Holocaust survivors have influenced the study of transgenerational trauma more broadly, which has been noted amongst descendants of African-Americans forced into slavery, Native American genocide survivors, war survivors, refugees, and survivors of domestic violence.

The substantial work done on second-generation syndrome, "may have relevance to the genocidal trauma and intergenerational transmission of trauma affecting Indigenous populations, including many Aboriginal families and communities".
