= Sherman James =

American epidemiologist

Sherman A. James is an American epidemiologist. He is the Susan B. King Professor Emeritus of Public Policy at the Duke University Sanford School of Public Policy, and previously taught at University of North Carolina at Chapel Hill from 1973 to 1989 and at the University of Michigan School of Public Health as the John P. Kirscht Collegiate Professor of Public Health from 1989 to 2003. He was elected to the National Academy of Medicine in 2000.

James received an A.B. degree (psychology and philosophy) from Talladega College in 1964 and a Ph.D. in psychology from Washington University in St. Louis in 1973.

James' research focused on social determinants of health in the US, racial disparities in health and healthcare, and the health effects of structural racism. He is known for conceiving the term John Henryism in the 1970s.

== Selected publications ==
- Johnson-Lawrence Vicki, Scott Jamie B, James Sherman A. (August 2019). "Education, Perceived Discrimination and Risk for Depression in a Southern Black Cohort." Aging & Mental Health." doi: 10.1080/13607863.2019.1647131.
- Kramer, Michael R.; Black, Nyesha C.; Matthews, Stephen A.; James, Sherman A. (December 2017). "The legacy of slavery and contemporary declines in heart disease mortality in the U.S. South". SSM - Population Health. 3: 609–617. doi:10.1016/j.ssmph.2017.07.004. PMC 5718368. PMID 29226214.
- James, Sherman A. (June 1, 2017). "Invited Commentary: Cassel's "The Contribution of the Social Environment to Host Resistance"—A Modern Classic". American Journal of Epidemiology. 185 (11): 1032–1034. doi:10.1093/aje/kwx070. hdl:10161/15173. PMID 28535254.
- Barrington, Debbie S.; James, Sherman A. (February 2017). "Receipt of public assistance during childhood and hypertension risk in adulthood". Annals of Epidemiology. 27 (2): 108–114.e2. doi:10.1016/j.annepidem.2016.11.012. PMC 5334660. PMID 28094118.
- Mujahid, Mahasin S.; James, Sherman A.; Kaplan, George A.; Salonen, Jukka T. (January 2017). "Socioeconomic position, John Henryism, and incidence of acute myocardial infarction in Finnish men". Social Science & Medicine. 173: 54–62. doi:10.1016/j.socscimed.2016.11.034. hdl:10161/15172. PMID 27923154.
- James, Sherman A. (2017). "The strangest of all encounters: racial and ethnic discrimination in US health care". Cadernos de Saúde Pública. 33 (suppl 1) e00104416. doi:10.1590/0102-311X00104416. hdl:10161/15176. PMID 28492707.
