= Joy DeGruy =

American author, academic and researcher

Joy Angela DeGruy (born October 16, 1957) is an American author, academic, and researcher. DeGruy previously served as assistant professor at Portland State University School of Social Work. She is currently president and CEO of DeGruy Publications, Inc and Executive Director of the non-profit Be The Healing, Inc. She is mostly known for her book Post Traumatic Slave Syndrome.

== Early life and education ==
DeGruy was born October 16, 1957, in Los Angeles, California. She was the youngest of four children born to working-class parents, Oscar DeGruy, a truck driver and Nellie Parker DeGruy, a stay-at-home mom. Her parents grew up in Louisiana. Joy's maternal great-grandparents were from Belize.

Joy attended elementary school, junior high school, and senior high school in Los Angeles Unified School District. She participated in a dual enrollment program that allowed her to complete junior college coursework while a student at Crenshaw High School. DeGruy has stated that her high school guidance counselor told her that she was not college material.

DeGruy holds a bachelor's of science in Speech Communication from Portland State University, two master's degrees (in Social Work from Portland State and Clinical Psychology from Pacific University), and a Ph.D. in Social Work and Social Research from Portland State University's Graduate School of Social Work. Her doctoral dissertation studied predictive variables for African American Male Youth Violence using Sociocultural Theory, Social Learning Theory and Trauma Theory frameworks. She also employed the "new" theory of Post Traumatic Slave Syndrome, which would later become the subject of her 2005 book, Post Traumatic Slave Syndrome: America's Legacy of Enduring Injury and Healing. Professor Eileen M. Brennan served as DeGruy's dissertation advisor.

== Teaching ==
From 2001 to 2014, DeGruy was an assistant professor in the School of Social Work at Portland State University, where she taught core classes in Human Behavior in the Social Environment, Generalist Practice, Field Instruction, African American Community (Seminar), African American Multigenerational Trauma & Issues of Violence, and Diversity and Social Justice.

== Research and publications ==
In an interview for Essence Magazine, DeGruy summarizes: "research has shown that severe trauma can affect multiple generations ... no one has ever measured the impact that slavery had on us, what it’s meant for us to live for centuries in a hostile environment. We have been hurt, not just by the obvious physical assaults, but in deep psychological ways..."

DeGruy's theorization is based on qualitative and quantitative research conducted by the author in both America and Africa.

According to the American Psychological Association (APA), which awarded DeGruy a 2023 Presidential Citation, Post Traumatic Slave Syndrome: America's Legacy of Enduring Injury and Healing has amassed over 1700 research citations in peer-reviewed journal articles and books.

=== Critical reception ===
The New Republic described the theory as "original thinking" that "explains[s] the effects of unresolved trauma on the behaviors of blacks that is transmitted from generation to generation," and suggested that the theory can be historicized more broadly a said P.T.S.S. "lays the groundwork for understanding how the past has influenced the present, and opens up the discussion of how we can use the strengths we have gained to heal."

DeGruy's theory is not without controversy. P.T.S.S. has been criticized by scholars such as Ibram X. Kendi, who included it in his history of racist ideas in America, Stamped from the Beginning.

Others defend her work. Notably Guy Emerson Mount, Assistant Professor of African American Studies at Auburn University, offers a counter assessment for Kendi's critique:

This post was inspired by Professor Ibram X. Kendi's insightful AAIHS critique of Professor Joy DeGruy's equally insightful book Post Traumatic Slave Syndrome. In the spirit of full disclosure, Professor Kendi and I are both contributors to a forthcoming AAIHS anthology titled New Perspectives on the Black Intellectual Tradition, edited by Keisha N. Blain, Chris Cameron and Ashley D. Farmer. At the same time, Professor DeGruy is a family friend. I’ve hung out with her nephew and attended her daughter's wedding. My wife and her sisters grew up with her as a role model . . . Having said that, I am sympathetic to many of the critiques that Professor Kendi has put forward. Yet I also believe that post traumatic slave syndrome (PTSS) can still be reconciled to those critiques and, in the hands of skilled practitioners, advance an anti-racist agenda (even if it is, as Professor Kendi says, a “racist idea”). In the end, Professor Kendi is right to worry that PTSS will, at the very least, fall into the wrong hands and be used by racist forces as further confirmation of black cultural/psychological/ontological inferiority . . . Prof. Kendi anticipates racist forces will misread and weaponize PTSS in the same way that they have done with almost every other previous black self-help idea including most recently the stop the violence movements of the 1990s aimed at reducing ‘black-on-black crime.’ But Professor DeGruy is, at the end of the day, simply a black psychologist trying to help black people survive psychically in a world that is trying daily to strip them of their humanity. Professor Kendi is right—the world has not succeeded in doing so. But Professor DeGruy is also right—we could all use a little healing.

== See also ==
- Gail E. Wyatt
- bell hooks
- W. E. B. Du Bois
- African-American Studies
- Whiteness Studies
