= Slave health on plantations in the United States =

The health of slaves on plantations in the American South was a matter of concern to both slaves and their owners. Slavery had associated with it the health problems commonly associated with poverty. It was to the economic advantage of owners to keep their working slaves healthy, and those of reproductive age reproducing. Those who could not work or reproduce because of illness or age were sometimes abandoned by their owners, expelled from plantations, and left to fend for themselves.

== Life expectancy ==
A broad and common measure of the health of a population is its life expectancy. According to "Time on the Cross: The Economics of American Slavery," by Robert Fogel, the life expectancy in 1850 of a White person in the United States was forty; for a slave, it was thirty-six. Mortality statistics for Whites were calculated from census data; statistics for slaves were based on small sample-sizes, and all records used by Fogel to calculate the average life expectancy of enslaved people came from the slaveholders themselves, casting doubt on their accuracy and usefulness.

== Diseases among slaves ==
European physicians in the West Indies frequently shared their knowledge of black-related diseases with North American colleagues. Diseases that were thought to be "negro diseases" included, but were not limited to:

- Tetanus
- Neonatal tetanus
- Parasitic worms
- Diphtheria
- Whooping cough
- Cholera
- Typhoid
- Tuberculosis
- Influenza
- Hepatitis
- Rheumatism
- Scabies
- Psoriasis, also known as lepra vulgaris
- Leprosy
- Syphilis
- Yaws, also known as frambesia

While working on plantations in the Southern United States, many slaves faced serious health problems. Improper nutrition, the unsanitary living conditions, and excessive labor made them more susceptible to diseases than their owners; the death rates among the slaves were significantly higher due to diseases.

Considered today to be abuse based on pseudo-science, two alleged mental illnesses of slaves were described in scientific literature: drapetomania, the mental illness that made slaves desire to run away, and dysaesthesia aethiopica, laziness or "rascality". Both were treated with whippings.

=== Housing and Disease ===
Plantation housing for enslaved laborers was frequently poorly constructed, low to the ground, and lacking proper ventilation and shading. Dwellings were commonly built directly on or near soil, causing lower timbers to rot within a few years. The decay of structural wood, combined with the accumulation of organic refuse beneath and around cabins, produced noxious fumes and filth that contemporary observers directly linked to outbreaks of disease.

Interior living conditions further heightened health risks. Cabins were typically single-room structures housing entire families, resulting in severe overcrowding and restricted air flow. Unsealed cracks in unhewn log walls were frequently stuffed with dirty rags, animal skins, and feathers, creating unsanitary conditions. When individuals fell ill, remaining in damp, unventilated quarters severely limited their chances of recovery and negated the effectiveness of medical treatments, contributing to elevated mortality rates.

== Slave diet ==
There are contrasting views on slave's diets and access to food. Some portray slaves as having plenty to eat, while others portray "the fare of the plantation [as] coarse and scanty". For the most part, slaves' diet consisted of a form of fatty pork and corn or rice. Beef and fish were also given as rations. Cornbread was commonly eaten by slaves. Produce from a vegetable patch or garden could also be added to the rations. Historian Ulrich Bonnell Phillips found that slaves received the following standard, with little or no deviation: "a quart (1 liter) of cornmeal and half-pound (300 gm) of salt pork per day for each adult and proportionally for children, commuted or supplemented with sweet potatoes, field peas, syrup, rice, fruit, and 'garden sass' [vegetables]". According to Douglass Chambers, "slave owners stinted the slaves, throwing the people back onto their own resourcefulness for sustenance. In the eighteenth and nineteenth centuries, masters provided slaves with only the barest necessities. Weekly or monthly rations consisted of salt fish and/ or pork, corn or cornmeal, and salt and perhaps molasses. The largest plantation holders usually doled out salted herring as well as smoked pork and corn, which the slaves pounded and mixed with beans and boiled into hominy".

Archaeological excavations have found evidence that the primary component of slaves' diet was meat from livestock such as pigs and cows, but that slaves also supplemented their diets by hunting wild species such as opossum, racoon, snapping turtle, deer, squirrel, duck, and rabbit, catching fish and oysters, and eating walnuts, grapes, blackberries, and hickory nuts.

Historical research at the Burroughs plantation in Franklin County, Virginia by the National Park Service showed that enslaved people there had a diet of cornbread, pork, chicken, sweet potatoes, and boiled corn for breakfast. Slaves at the plantation had a variety of vegetables with which to make stews; "Asparagus, beets, beans, black-eyed peas, carrots, cabbage, cucumbers, garden peas, Irish potatoes, kale, lettuce, lima beans, muskmelons, okra, onions, peppers, radishes, tomatoes, turnips, and watermelons would be planted, ripened, and harvested from spring through fall". According to research at George Washington's Mount Vernon plantation, the standard ration of slaves there was cornmeal and salted fish, with adult slaves receiving a daily ration of 1 quart of cornmeal and 5 to 8 ounces of salted fish, usually shad or herring. Slaves there also hunted various species such as deer, opossum, and turkeys, foraged for fruits such as peaches, cherries, and persimmons from the plantation orchards or nearby woods, and grew beans and cowpeas in personal gardens.

Antebellum plantations had a larger population of hogs than cows, therefore producing more pork than beef. There are a few reasons behind having more pigs than cows: a stereotype that slaves preferred pork over beef, pigs were easier to feed, beef was harder to preserve so it was typically only served fresh (which happened more often in the winter because the cold slowed spoiling), a fear of fresh meat because it was believed that it caused disease among blacks (which it was probably not that fresh), and the planters' conviction that "hog was the only proper meat for laborers".

Due to the shortage of cows, slave diets lacked milk. There was often a stereotype in the Antebellum South that slaves were lactose intolerant. However, many slaves had trouble digesting lactose (in dairy products) because it was not a staple in African diets. Due to the summer heat and the poor quality of the animals themselves, milk became a scarce product only available seasonally. When it did become available, it was first given to Whites and if any remained, then to slave children. Additionally, there is some scientific hypotheses behind Blacks more often being lactose intolerant than Whites today. In West Africa, the presence of the tsetse fly made raising cattle practically impossible, creating a historical situation in which there was no need for humans to develop higher levels of the lactase enzyme (which allows the body to digest lactose).

Scholars came to realize that the slave's diets were quantitatively satisfactory, but not qualitatively sufficient. The poor quality of food led to slaves that were either "physically impaired or chronically ill". Due to slaves' diets lacking quality, there were many vitamin and nutrient insufficiencies that lead to sicknesses. These were not recognized at the time as caused by poor diet.

- Vitamin A deficiency led to weakened eyesight. (Vitamin A was not identified until the 20th century.)
- Lack of milk contributed to diseases such as rickets and calcium deficiency, causing weakened bones.
- Inadequate iron led to anemia.

== Clothing ==
The masters only gave slaves pairs of "gator shoes" or "brogans" for footwear, and sometimes children and adults who were not working had to walk around barefoot. These clothes and shoes were insufficient for field work; they did not last very long for field slaves. It is judged that the health of male workers broke down rapidly after they joined the field gangs.

== Medical attentions ==
Page from Francis T. Tennille Slave Medical Care Accounts, 1859-1860

"Evidence exists that many...masters provided some health care for their slave investments.... Some planters employed doctors to come every two weeks to check on slaves' health and give them any needed medicine." This was quite lucrative for the physicians.

However, slave masters often tried to cure their ill slaves before they called for a doctor. Planters wishing to save money relied on their own self-taught skills and the help of their wives to address the health care needs of slaves. Some Black people developed or retained from African heritage their own brand of care, complete with special remedies, medical practitioners, and rituals. If the home treatment did not help to improve the slave's condition, they would then send them to the physician or ask the doctor to come to the plantation. A slave who became ill meant loss of working time; death an even greater loss. Given the cost of slaves and their importance to plantation economies, planters organized slave hospitals to treat their serious health problems. There were also separate physicians for slaves and whites because it was believed that slaves' bodies were fundamentally different from whites'. Due to this thinking, many slaves became the subjects of physician's experimental interests to help expand both the physician's knowledge and reputation, often resulting in slave's mutilation and death.

=== Slave hospitals ===
Slave hospitals were thought to be an essential part of plantation life by Dr. A. P. Merrill and Dr. Samuel A. Cartwright. The physicians believed that the slaves' bodies were biologically and physiologically different than those of Whites; therefore, they should have their own resource for medical attention and treatment. In some histories of the Antebellum South, like William Scarborough's Masters of the Big House (2006), slaveholders are depicted as going to great lengths to protect the health of their slaves. Examples of this include vaccinating slave infants against smallpox, paying hundreds of thousands of dollars in medical expenses, and dispensing sherry or madeira wine to sick slaves. Dr. Merrill provides a detailed description of what he thought slave hospitals should be like in an 1853 article about plantation hygiene. However, in reality, the hospitals were representations of the way slaves were viewed: as chattel. They were often a slave cabin used to isolate those with a fever or illness to make sure that the slave was not faking an illness in an attempt to run away. Frances Kemble's recollection of the slave infirmary at Butler Island, Georgia, paints a stark reality of slave women lying on the floor in "tattered and filthy blankets". Dr. J. Marion Sims set up, in his back yard in Montgomery, Alabama, the first hospital in the United States for black females, on whom he developed techniques and materials (silver suture) for gynecological surgery. In the later 20th century, Sims' surgical experimentation on enslaved women, who could not consent because they could not refuse, was criticized as unethical.

=== Experimentation ===
Southern medical education's predisposition for use of black bodies to teach anatomy and be subjects of clinical experiments led to a major distrust of White physicians among slaves. The exploitation of slave's bodies for medical knowledge created a horrific doctor-patient relationship that involved a third party: the slave owner. This relationship often left the slave voiceless and deemed "medically incompetent", therefore taking control of their own bodies away from them.

==== Gynecology ====
A major field of experimentation that involved slaves was gynecology under Dr. J. Marion Sims in Montgomery, Alabama between 1845 and 1849. Dr. Sims is known for being a pioneer in the treatment of clubfoot, advances in "women's medicine", his role in the founding of the Women's Hospital in New York, and as the "father of American gynecology". Sims routinely operated on nine slave women, of which only three are known: Anarcha, Betsy, and Lucy. The purpose of the operations was to try and fix conditions called vesico-vaginal fistula and recto-vaginal fistula, i.e. a tear in the vaginal wall resulting in chronic leakage from the bladder or colon. These conditions were common results of childbirth during Sims' time. However, these conditions do not include symptoms of chronic pain, just discomfort and most likely embarrassment, suggesting that Sims was exaggerating their conditions to gain a competitive edge over his colleagues.

Betsy, Anarcha, and Lucy survived multiple attempts to fix their condition, and although Sims was able to close the fistula, small perforations remained after healing, leakage continued, and often the sutures became infected. It was not until after the thirtieth surgery that Sims was successful on Anarcha.During these surgeries, the women were not under anesthesia due to the false belief that slaves possessed a high tolerance for pain, only an ineffective opium that resulted in constipation and nausea instead of anesthetic.After the success of Anarcha, many White women came to Sims to have the procedure, yet none of them endured a single operation, noting the intense pain associated with the surgery.

==== Other ====
Dr. Sims also performed other surgical experimentations on slaves, including facial operations. Slave owners came to Sims in last attempt efforts to save their investments. One particular case that was published in The American Journal of the Medical Sciences involved a slave named Sam whose owner thought he had a gumboil on his face that was a result of syphilis medication. Surgery was attempted on Sam before by another physician, but was unsuccessful because "at the first incision…Sam had leaped from is chair and absolutely refused to submit to further cutting". Sims knew of the attempted surgery and was "determined not to be foiled in the attempt" of his own. Sims attempted to dissect the patient's jaw-bone over the course of a forty-minute operation. In this time, Sims removed a tooth to make room and after unsuccessful attempts with a "small, long, narrow saw" and "Liston's bone forceps", Sims resorted to the chain-saw to remove the diseased bone. Infirmaries, like Sims', allowed physicians to be successful businessmen in the slavery-based Southern economy, but also to create professional reputations as clinical medical researchers.

== See also ==
- Race and health in the United States
- House slave
- Disease in colonial America
- Seasoning (slavery)
- African American health
- Slavery hypertension hypothesis
- Weathering hypothesis
- Disability in American slavery
