= Slavery hypertension hypothesis =

Dubious evolutionary hypothesis

The slavery hypertension hypothesis proposes that disproportionately high rates of hypertension among black people in the New World are due to selective pressure preferring individuals who retain more sodium among black slaves during the Middle Passage.

== History ==
It was originally proposed in 1983 by Clarence Grim and Thomas W. Wilson, who subsequently promoted it heavily during the remainder of the 1980s. It gained considerable media attention when Grim presented it at a conference in 1988. In 1990, the first medical textbook mentioning the hypothesis was published. The first peer-reviewed paper advancing the hypothesis was published by Wilson and Grim in 1991. This study also received considerable media attention.

In December 2004, a paper titled CYP3A Variation and the Evolution of Salt-Sensitivity Variants was published which drew attention to the importance of the CPY3A5*1 and CPY3A5*3 alleles of cytochrome P450 CYP3A5 in hypertensive disease. The paper showed a substantial correlation between geographical latitude and the CPY3A5 allele distribution, with African Americans descended from the slave trade having retained the equatorial haplotype.

In 2005 the thesis that black Americans who trace their immigration to the slave era experience lower life expectancy due to hypertensive disease associated with the slave trade was revisited by the academic team of David Cutler, Roland G. Fryer Jr. and Nathan Glazer. This paper was circulated in mimeo, was presented at a conference, and received 12 citations in the literature despite never being published in a formal journal. The paper shows that Black Americans having descended from the slave trade have largely retained the allele associated with equatorial populations, have higher sodium retention than other populations in America (including black people who later emigrated to America after the slave trade had ended), and have correspondingly higher hypertensive disease.

The thesis gained renewed media attention when Oprah Winfrey mentioned the hypothesis in an interview with Dr. Oz in 2007.

Since it was originally proposed, the hypothesis has been challenged, and it has been described as a "myth". Detractors argue that the hypothesis is inconsistent with historical evidence regarding salt deficiency in Africa or the causes of death aboard slave ships. Grim and Robinson responded to Kaufman and Hall, maintaining the validity of the hypothesis and its consistency with historical descriptions of slavery.

== See also ==
- African American health
- Intergroup anxiety
- John Henryism
- Minority stress
- Seasoning (slavery)
- Slave health on plantations in the United States
- Weathering hypothesis
