= Historical trauma =

Cumulative emotional harm

Historical trauma or collective trauma refers to the cumulative emotional harm of an individual or generation caused by a traumatic experience or event.

According to its advocates, collective trauma evokes a variety of responses, most prominently through substance abuse, which is used as a vehicle for attempting to numb pain. This model seeks to use this to explain other self-destructive behavior, such as suicidal thoughts and gestures, depression, anxiety, low self-esteem, anger, violence, and difficulty recognizing and expressing emotions. Many historians and scholars believe the manifestations of violence and abuse in certain communities are directly associated with the unresolved grief that accompanies continued trauma.

Historical trauma and its manifestations are seen as an example of transgenerational trauma (though the existence of transgenerational trauma itself is disputed). For example, a pattern of paternal abandonment of a child might be seen across three generations, or the actions of an abusive parent might be seen in continued abuse across generations. These manifestations can also stem from the trauma of events, such as the witnessing of war, genocide, or death. For these populations that have witnessed these mass-level traumas, several generations later, these populations tend to have higher rates of disease.

== Definition ==
The term collective trauma calls attention to the "psychological reactions to a traumatic event that affect[s] an entire society." Collective trauma does not only represent a historical fact or event, but is a collective memory of an awful event that happened to that group of people.

American sociologist Kai Erikson was one of the first to document collective trauma in his book Everything in Its Path, which documented the aftermath of a catastrophic flood in 1972.

Gilad Hirschberger of Interdisciplinary Center, Herzliya, Israel, defines the term:

The term collective trauma refers to the psychological reactions to a traumatic event that affect an entire society; it does not merely reflect an historical fact, the recollection of a terrible event that happened to a group of people. It suggests that the tragedy is represented in the collective memory of the group, and like all forms of memory it comprises not only a reproduction of the events, but also an ongoing reconstruction of the trauma in an attempt to make sense of it.

Clarifying the term collective, Ursula König (2018) focused on two different levels of collective trauma:

- Identity group level: Traumatisation can occur amongst various identity groups i.e. race, age, class, caste, religious and/or ethnic groups. Both size and group coherence may differ and different identity markers may overlap (intersectionality), influencing inter and intra-group dynamics.
- Society-level: At the societal level, societies may be affected by traumatisation within a nation state or at a sub/transnational level, influencing the fabric of society as well as the interactions within and between societies.

According to these two distinctions, a collective trauma can only be defined as such if affects can be clearly defined at either level. For example, the traumatisation of many individuals may not be considered collective, unless their traumatic experiences are used as key identity markers in public discourses and/or as a way of self-expression/-definition. Once trauma of many individuals is framed and used as a collective identity marker we can speak of it as such.

Furthermore, a distinction can be made between collective identity markers which in practice are all highly interwoven:

- Collective narratives
- Collective emotions
- Collective mental models/norms and values.

== History of research ==
Maria Yellow Horse Brave Heart first developed the concept of historical trauma while working with Lakota communities in the 1980s. Yellow Horse Brave Heart's scholarship focused on the ways in which the psychological and emotional traumas of colonisation, relocation, assimilation, and American Indian boarding schools have manifested within generations of the Lakota population. Yellow Horse Brave Heart's article "Wakiksuyapi: Carrying the Historical Trauma of the Lakota," published in 2000, compares the effects and manifestations of historical trauma on Holocaust survivors and Native American peoples. Her scholarship concluded that the manifestations of trauma, although produced by different events and actions, are exhibited in similar ways within each afflicted community.

Other significant original research on the mechanisms and transmission of intergenerational trauma has been done by scholars such as Daniel Schechter, whose work builds on the pioneers in this field such as: Judith Kestenberg, Dori Laub, Selma Fraiberg, Alicia Lieberman, Susan Coates, Charles Zeanah, Karlen Lyons-Ruth, Yael Danieli, Rachel Yehuda and others. Although each scholar focuses on a different population – such as Native Americans, African Americans, or Holocaust survivors – all have concluded that the mechanism and transmission of intergenerational trauma is abundant within communities that experience traumatic events. Daniel Schechter's work has included the study of experimental interventions that may lead to changes in trauma-associated mental representation and may help in the stopping of intergenerational cycles of violence.

Joy DeGruy's book, Post Traumatic Slave Syndrome, analyzes the manifestation of historical trauma in African American populations, and its correlation to the lingering effects of slavery. In 2018, Dodging Bullets—Stories from Survivors of Historical Trauma, the first documentary film to chronicle historical trauma in Indian country, was released. It included interviews with scientist Rachel Yehuda, sociologist Melissa Walls, and Anton Treuer along with first hand testimonies of Dakota, Lakota, Ojibwe and Blackfeet tribal members.

While all of these contributions to this field of research are valuable bases of knowledge, it is also important to understand what type of limitations researchers are faced with when approaching such a complicated topic. The first thing to keep in mind is the individual nature of trauma itself. Each person experiences trauma in a different way and has a different definition of what trauma even is for that matter. In their 2014 study Mohatt, Thompson, Thai and Tebes address this issue directly saying “because trauma is a representation as opposed to an event, and because we cannot directly know the minds and lives of the past, we cannot assume that our way of responding to negative events is valid for prior generations. (Mohatt, et al)”. This type of flaw is common when looking at topics that combine historical events (trauma) and the feelings that people have regarding them. However, it does not mean that research is invalid, we must simply view it as a public narrative. At that point it not only keeps its original impact but actually gains some more traction and becomes a community advancement tool due to its emotionally charged nature. It also helps connect the issue to the present day world. “A narrative framework for historical trauma offers improved conceptual clarity and opportunity for scientific investigation into the relationship between trauma and present-day health by considering the ways in which historical traumas are represented in contemporary individual and community stories (Mohatt, et al)”.

== Affected groups ==
Traumatic events witnessed by an entire society can stir up collective sentiment, often resulting in a shift in that society's culture and mass actions.

Well known collective traumas include: slavery in the United States, the Trail of Tears, the Great Irish Famine, the Armenian genocide, the Nanjing Massacre, the Holocaust, attack on Pearl Harbor, the atomic bombings of Hiroshima and Nagasaki, the Partition of India and Pakistan, the Palestinian Nakba, the Halabja chemical attack, the MS Estonia in Sweden, the September 11, 2001 attacks in the United States, the COVID-19 pandemic, deportations and gulags of the Soviet Union and various others.

Collective traumas have been shown to play a key role in group identity formation (see: Law of Common Fate). During World War II, a US submarine, the USS Puffer (SS-268), came under several hours of depth charge attack by a Japanese surface vessel until the ship became convinced the submarine had somehow escaped. Psychological studies later showed that crewmen transferred to the submarine after the event were never accepted as part of the team. Later, US naval policy was changed so that after events of such psychological trauma, the crew would be dispersed to new assignments.

Rehabilitation of survivors becomes extremely difficult when an entire nation has experienced such severe traumas as war, genocide, torture, massacre, etc. Treatment of individuals is less effective when society itself is traumatized. Trauma remains chronic and can potentially reproduce itself as long as social causes are not addressed and perpetrators continue to enjoy impunity. Society as a whole may suffer from a form of chronic trauma. However, ways to heal collective trauma have recently been created.

During the Algerian War, Frantz Omar Fanon found his practice of treatment of native Algerians ineffective due to the continuation of the horror of a colonial war. He emphasized about the social origin of traumas, joined the liberation movement and urged oppressed people to purge themselves of their degrading traumas through their collective liberation struggle. He made the following remarks in his letter of resignation, as the Head of the Psychiatry Department at the Blida-Joinville Hospital in Algeria:

"If psychiatry is the medical technique that aims to enable man no longer to be a stranger to his environment, I owe it to myself to affirm that the Arab, permanently an alien in his own country, lives in a state of absolute depersonalization".

Inculcation of horror and anxiety, through widespread torture, massacre, genocide and similar coercive measures has happened frequently in human history. There are plenty of examples in our modern history. Tyrants have always used their technique of "psychological artillery" in an attempt to cause havoc and confusion in the minds of people and hypnotize them with intimidation and cynicism. The result is a collective trauma that will pass through generations. Collective trauma can be alleviated through cohesive and collective efforts such as recognition, remembrance, solidarity, communal therapy and massive cooperation.

Multiple international scientific studies have shown how the emotional states of a mother has a direct impact on the developing nervous system of their child and the ensuing development of their brain systems over time.

A study conducted in the aftermath of the Six day war in Israel in 1967 for example, found that women who were pregnant during the wars occurrence were statistically more likely to have had children with schizophrenia. What happened at the collective level of the country, was directly reflected in the individual neurobiological systems of the infants in the womb. Due to the direct correlation/connection between the nervous system and every other organ in our bodies, collective trauma is also evident at the cellular level. Trauma can thus not be understood in purely individual terms.

Collective trauma does not merely reflect a historical fact or the recollection of a traumatic event that happened to a group of people. Collective trauma suggests that the tragedy is represented in the collective memory of the group, and like all forms of memory it comprises not only a reproduction of the events, but also an ongoing reconstruction of the trauma in an attempt to make sense of it. Collective memory of a trauma is different from individual memory because collective memory persists beyond the lives of the direct survivors of the events, and is remembered by group members that may be far removed from the traumatic events in time and space.

=== Black Community ===
The historical trauma inflicted by slavery continues to affect the Black community today, 160 years post-slavery. Since the Emancipation Proclamation of 1863, Black people have had to face discriminatory Black Codes, poverty, exploitative sharecropping practices, the KKK, lynchings, resistance toward their civil rights movement, racial prejudice like racial zoning laws and more. In 1963 the Ku Klux Klan bombed the 16th Street Baptist Church in Birmingham killing four little girls. Sarah Collins Rudolph was 12 years old and survived the bombing but lost her sister and friend in the attack. The blast from the bomb sprayed her eyes with glass; she lost one eye and the other was barely saved. She continually suffered due to expenses, as well as problems with the remaining eye. Since she is a Black woman she was never seen as equal to a White woman, and this is what lead into the historical trauma we see today. Statistics show that Black people have higher rates of poverty, poor health, maladaptive behaviors, lower quality of life, higher rates of disease, stress, and poor mental health, lower wages/job security, higher homicide rates and drug use and so much more due to the historical trauma they’ve endured over time.

=== Native American Community ===
Maria Yellow Horse Brave Heart first coined the term Indigenous Historical Trauma (IHT) in the 1980s, to characterize the psycho-social legacy of European colonization in North American Indigenous communities. The term Indigenous Historical Trauma (IHT) can be useful to explain emotions and other psychological phenomena experienced by Native Americans today. Identifying IHT helps with recognizing the "psychological distress and health disparities" linked to current Indigenous communities. The broader concept of Historical Trauma was developed from this, and gained footing in the clinical and health science literatures in the first two decades of the 21st century. In 2019, a team of psychologists at the University of Michigan published a systematic review of the literature so far on the relationship between IHT and adverse health outcomes for Indigenous peoples in the United States and Canada.

An example of Indigenous Historical Trauma is the "Indian boarding schools" created in the 19th century to acculturate Native Americans to European culture. According to one of their advocates Richard Henry Pratt, the intention of these schools was to literally "kill the Indian" in the student, "and save the man". These schools attempted to strip children of their cultural identity by practices such as cutting off their long hair, or forbidding them to speak their native language. After the school year was over, some indigenous children were hired to work for “non-Indian families” and many did not return home to their families.

The fear and loneliness caused by such schools can be readily imagined. But scientific research has consistently found that the stress caused by Indian boarding schools (due to mistreatment and sexual abuse) resulted in depression. Descendants of boarding school survivors may carry this historical trauma for generations, and in the present day, Native American students still face challenges related to their lack of awareness of "psychological injury or harm from ancestral experiences with colonial violence and oppression". Indeed, people who are unaware of the traumatic experiences their ancestors endured may find themselves involved in continued patterns of substance abuse, violence, physical abuse, verbal abuse, and suicide attempts.

=== Jewish Community ===
The Jewish community has historically faced persecution. The Holocaust is one of the most widely-known examples of collective Jewish suffering. From 1933-1945 the Jewish community was broken by the Nazi regime and resulted in the death of 6 million Jews and others. Even though decades later, and the Holocaust has ended, they have still had to struggle with the historical trauma brought on them. There are museums with a mountain of shoes that were stripped from Jews being thrown into concentration camps and concentration camps like Auschwitz that people can visit. The Jewish community is constantly reminded of the trauma they or their family endured. In 2003 and in 2005, the Jewish US Anti-Defamation League spoke out against several animal rights groups that compared the confinement and killing of farm animals to the experience that Jews and other groups in concentration camps went through.

== Effects ==
Historical trauma can result in a variety of psychological effects. However, it is most commonly seen through high rates of substance abuse, alcoholism, mental health issues, domestic violence, and abuse within afflicted communities. The effects and manifestations of trauma are extremely important in understanding the present-day conditions of afflicted populations.

Within Native American communities, high rates of alcoholism and suicide have direct correlation to the violence, mistreatment, and abuses experienced at boarding schools, and the loss of cultural heritage and identity these institutions facilitated. Although many present-day children never experienced these schools first-hand, the "injuries inflicted at Indian boarding schools are continuous and ongoing," affecting generations of Native peoples and communities.

Countries like Australia and Canada have issued formal apologies for their involvement in the creation and implementation of boarding schools that facilitated and perpetuated historical trauma. Australia's Bringing Them Home report and Canada's Truth and Reconciliation Commission (Canada) both detailed the "experiences, impacts, and consequences" of government-sponsored boarding schools on Indigenous communities and children. Both reports also detail the problems facing Indigenous populations today, such as economic and health disparities, and their connection to the historical trauma of colonization, removal, and forced assimilation.

Author and teacher Thomas Hübl, documenting his experiences working with Germans and Israelis to engage in dialogue around their shared historical and intergenerational trauma, writes:

Whether we refer to a person as victim or victimizer, oppressor or oppressed, it appears that no one, given time, remains untouched by collective suffering. Historical traumas impart their consequences indiscriminately upon child and family, institution and society, custom and culture, value and belief. Collective traumas distort social narratives, rupture national identities, and hinder the development of institutions, communities, and cultures, just as personally experienced trauma has the power to disrupt the psychological development of a growing child.

And while it is important to acknowledge the horrific effects of so many different historical traumas on a multigenerational level, it is also important to note some of the more productive outcomes that have been borne from that same intergenerational trickle down effect of some of these traumas. Cohn and Morrison found that grandchildren of Holocaust victims, rather than being involved in the conspiracy of silence surrounding the event, became more like advocates:

"In feeling highly connected to their grandparents’ stories of suffering and survival, the participants were found, on the whole, to be motivated to engage with their family histories, while committing themselves to sustaining these narratives into the future ( Cohn et al)”. Community organizers looking for people to speak and act in favor of social changes benefit from this, both on local community and national policy levels.

== Impacts on mental health ==
Collective traumas on the societal level can lead to a vast range on mental health problems, including Post Traumatic Stress Disorder (PTSD), depression, and dissociation. With collective traumas including events like natural disasters and even historical traumas like The Holocaust, the psychological impact of these vary based on direct and indirect experience. These traumas can result in psychological conditions to prevail, for example we see how PTSD and Alexithymia were developed by survivors of the 2009 L'Aquila earthquake. PTSD symptoms can include re-experiencing your traumatic event, avoidance, and emotional numbing such as alexithymia, and many more emotional and physical symptoms. These symptoms and the condition of PTSD are not limited to the victims themselves, but generations after traumatic events as well, typically up to two generations, which can be attributed to a combination of epigenetics and collective cultural trauma.

The mental health conditions due to collective trauma are not limited to PTSD, with studies showing higher levels of low self esteem in the children of holocaust survivors and higher levels of anxiety and depression in those who have experienced a collective historical trauma, like the Native Americans. Therefore, experiencing a collective trauma directly or indirectly can result in many mental health conditions for the collective.

== Collective cultural trauma ==
Cultural trauma is a form of collective trauma that is seen on a societal and macro-level. With collective trauma being experienced communally- psychological, and mental health consequences of cultural trauma can be explored from individual and community-level perspectives, factoring in family dynamics and geopolitical factors that can amplify the trauma experienced. The Holocaust provides an example of how survivors and their children experienced impaired functioning and poor adjustment to their environments.

Studies around refugees and immigrants also indicate how cultural trauma as a collective has vast negative mental health affects and how that is transmitted to future generations through family dynamics and cultural norms. An example of this can be witnessed through Sri Lanka, where a war and tsunami caused collective trauma to be experienced. On multiple levels, Sri Lankans who were affected by the war and tsunami saw changed in the dynamics of family relations, a lack of trust between community members and child rearing changed as well. These changed the cultural norms in Sri Lankan society, and created a negative environment where communities tended to be more dependent, passive, silent, without leadership, mistrustful, and suspicious. As a collectivist culture, this shared trauma changed the dynamic of communities in a significant way, and changed the cultural identities of many Sri Lankans. This highlights how collective trauma has an impact on cultural identity on a large scale.

== Treatment ==
Treatment of HT must repair the afflicted person or communities' connection with their culture, values, beliefs, and self-image. It takes the forms of individual counseling or therapy, spiritual help, and group or entire community gatherings, which are all important aspects in the foundations of the healing process. Treatment should be aimed at a renewal of destroyed culture, spiritual beliefs, customs, and family connections, and a focus on reaffirming one's self-image and place within a community.

Due to the collective and identity-based nature of HT, treatment approaches should be more than solutions to one individual's problems. Healing must also entail revitalization of practices and ways of being that are necessary not just for individuals but for the communities they exist within. Relieving personal distress and promoting individual coping are important treatment goals, but successful treatment of HT also depends upon community-wide efforts to ending intergenerational transmission of collective trauma.

Particular attention should be given to the needs and empowerment of peoples who are vulnerable, oppressed, and living in poverty. Social workers and activists should promote social justice and social change with and on behalf of clients, individuals, families, groups, and communities. In order for advocacy to be accurate and helpful to the afflicted populations, social workers should understand the cultural diversity, history, culture, and contemporary realities of clients. This can be done by educating people on racial-ethnic socialization, which is the process where children develop the behaviors, perceptions, values and attitudes of an ethnic group, and how they identify themselves and others in relation to those beliefs.

== Healing collective trauma ==
Communities can seek to heal collective traumas at the macro level. Individuals and groups can also seek healing from the impact of collective trauma.

Some examples of efforts towards healing collective trauma at the societal level include the Truth and Reconciliation Commission (South Africa), a restorative justice commission set up to facilitate healing from Apartheid in South Africa, memorials such as the National September 11 Memorial and Museum, and community arts projects such as the NAMES Project AIDS Memorial Quilt.

Collective trauma at the identity group level can present further complicating factors for healing, as it is often ongoing. Therapist, writer, and founder of the Embodiment Institute, Prentis Hemphill explains:

Oppression is actually how society organizes itself to control and distribute trauma.

One of the things we’re arguing is that, what oppression ends up being fundamentally, is the organization and concentration of traumatic experiences, in certain communities, or with certain peoples, and the removal of, or reduction of, the net or supports it takes, or the time, or the resources, to heal from or transform those traumatic experiences. That is what oppression ultimately does.

When we’re talking about the generational trauma or collective trauma that communities experience, we’re talking about the way it has been concentrated in our communities and the resources that have been pulled away or criminalized or interrupted, so that it becomes more and more difficult for communities to actually heal from those traumatic experiences."

Therapist Parker Schneider explains, "Ongoing traumas hinder the healing process, making it difficult for survivors to fully heal, or even just cope with the impacts of past traumas. Trauma experts emphasize the necessity of distancing oneself from ongoing trauma, particularly as the first stage in trauma recovery is the establishment of safety." Despite this challenge, communities experiencing collective trauma can create safety within individual and community relationships and seek healing through mutual support, activism, creative arts, and more.

Despite the challenges of healing from collective trauma, many theorists emphasize its importance as a factor for social change. In the Stanford Social Innovation Review, authors Ijeoma Njaka & Duncan Peacock examine trauma in the context of social change, arguing that trauma inhibits and limits our sustained attention to the complex crises we currently face. They write:

Writer and founder of the Academy of Inner Science Thomas Hübl suggests that one of the most important connections for healing collective and intergenerational trauma is between science and spirit, which he argues brings together the "double helix of ancient wisdom and contemporary understanding." Humans experience well-being when we have agency, dignity, and health, and are connected to ourselves, each other, and our world in sustainable and life-giving ways. Trauma is the disconnection from these things. Those working on social change, therefore, need to identify the connections and disconnections in the issues they care about. They also need support when they experience disconnection in their own lives.

In the multi-author volume "New Perspectives on Healing Collective Trauma" editor Scherto Gill offers in the concluding chapter the conclusion that collective trauma is rooted in longstanding structural injustices—such as racism, colonial legacies, and economic inequality—that damage communities across generations. In her view what she calls a politics of dignity is required for healing so that the inherent worth of all people is placed at the center of social and political design. This approach emphasizes rebuilding relationships, strengthening community participation, and creating institutions that support mutual respect and well-being. By acknowledging past harms and prioritizing human dignity, societies can begin repairing the deeper wounds that fuel ongoing trauma. In this view, healing is not only psychological but also structural and communal.

== See also ==
- Crimes against humanity
- Cultural genocide
- Cultural rights
- Democide
- Diaspora politics
- Dispossession, oppression, and depression
- Epigenetics
- Ethnic hatred
- Ethnic nationalism
- Ethnic violence
- Ethnocide
- Extrajudicial killing
- Extrajudicial punishment
- Forced displacement
- Genocidal massacre
- Genocide
- History of slavery
- Linguicide
- List of ethnic cleansing campaigns
- List of ethnic riots
- List of ongoing military conflicts
- LGBT trauma
- Lynching
- Minority group
- National trauma
- Pogrom
- Political cleansing of population
- Political violence
- Politicide
- Psychological trauma
- Social cleansing
- Religious violence
- Terrorism
- Transgenerational trauma
- War crime
