= Kestenberg =

Kestenberg is a surname. Notable people with the surname include:

- Judith Kestenberg (1910–1999), American child psychiatrist who worked with Holocaust survivors
- Leo Kestenberg (1882–1962), German-Israeli classical pianist, music educator, and cultural politician

== See also ==
- Kestenberg Movement Profile, a system of movement observation and analysis in psychology
