= Dodging Bullets—Stories from Survivors of Historical Trauma =

2018 documentary film

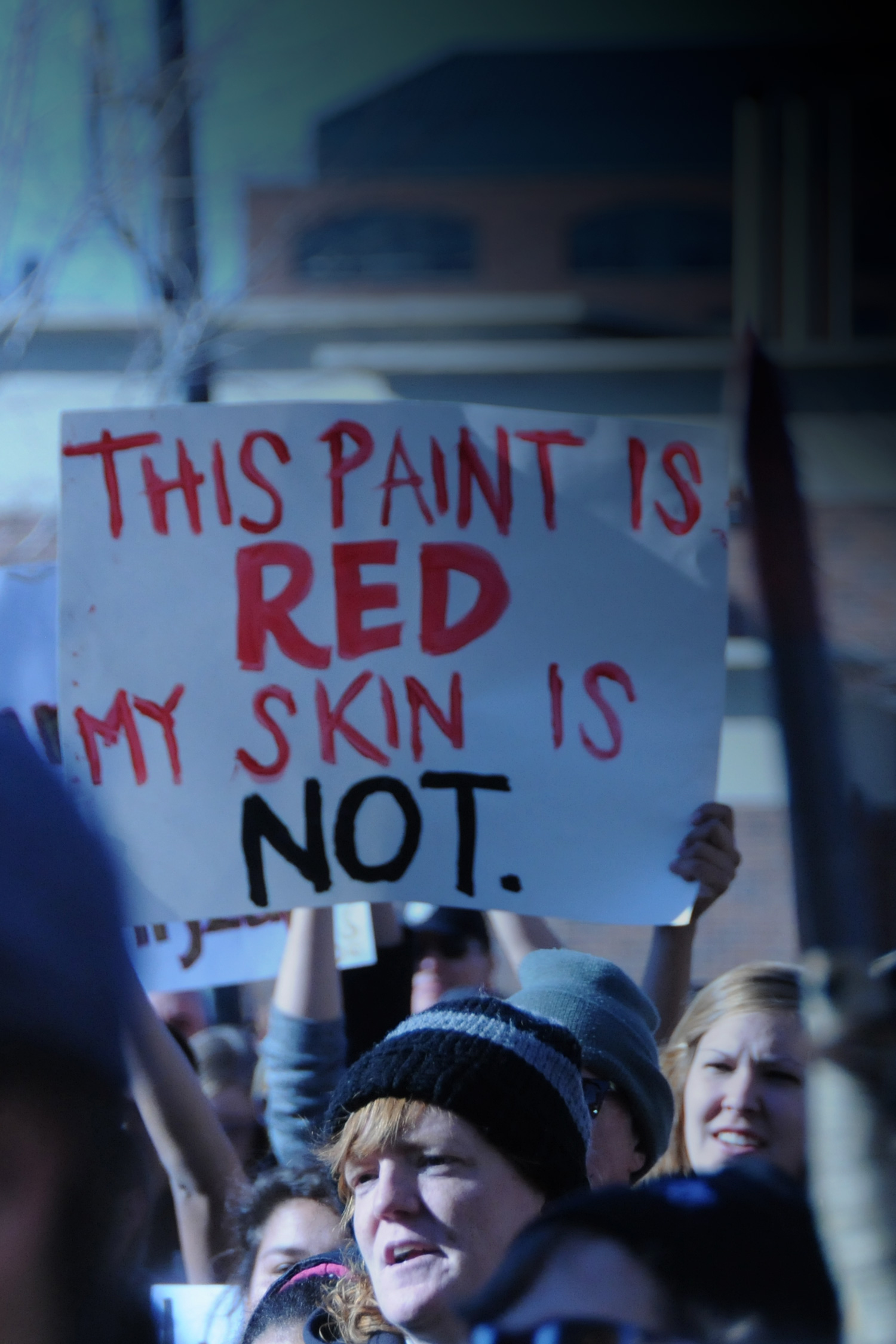
- Directed by: Kathy Broere, Sarah Edstrom, Jonathan Thunder (Tall Paul Segment), Bob Trench
- Produced by: Larry Long
- Cinematography: Bob Trench, Matt Myers
- Music by: Keith Secola, Tall Paul, Dorene Day Waubanewquay, Karlee Fellner, Mitch Walking Elk
- Release date: 2018
- Running time: 94 minutes
- Country: United States
- Languages: English, Dakota

Dodging Bullets—Stories from Survivors of Historical Trauma is a documentary film on historical trauma in Indian Country, co-directed by Kathy Broere (Blackfeet), Sarah Edstrom, Jonathan Thunder, and Bob Trench, and produced by Larry Long with soundtrack by Keith Secola. The film focuses on historical events and how they inter-generationally affect the Indigenous population in North America today.

The film premiered on April 20, 2018, at the Thin Line festival in Denton, Texas.

The film also showed at the Minneapolis–Saint Paul International Film Festival on May 3, 2018, where it was awarded "Best of Fest" and was awarded The Samuel Sprynczynatyk Storyteller Award: Best Documentary Feature at the North Dakota Human Rights Film Festival.

Filmed across the lands of the Plains Indians, which is now known as Wisconsin, Minnesota, the Dakotas, Nebraska, Colorado, and Montana, the film recalls first-hand storytelling that reflects how past generations were deeply impacted by mass trauma and how that trauma influences Indigenous peoples of the Americas today. The film ends on a positive path to healing through ceremony and cultural identity.

== Synopsis ==
The title of the film was inspired by American Indian Movement (AIM) co-founder Dennis Banks who stated "we have been dodging bullets for generations" which metaphorically infers that Native Americans not only have had to dodge bullets fired from guns, but also the genocide and ethnocide inflected by the colonists since first contact with Europeans. This film brings a cross-generational sampling of Indigenous people, researchers, and politicians to reveal reasons for their disproportionately high incidences of health disparities and social issues. This collection of stories, names Historical Trauma as the unique and insidious part of the genetic code that resilient Native American populations are still finding ways to dodge. The film focuses on Native Americans and is not the typical "tragedy porn" film about Indian country, it is more of an accurate portrayal of life with Indigenous people and researchers reflecting stereotypes by examining current issues of poverty, racism and mental illness through a historical lens.

== Co-director statement ==
"Stories of Survival from Historical Trauma will help us to heal. However, it is our connections to our culture, traditions, and family that has allowed us to not only to survive but will allow us to thrive now ... and forever", said Kathy Broere (Blackfeet).

== Cast ==
- Rick McArthur, AIM Legal Resources
- Dr. Rachel Yehuda, Director of the Traumatic Stress Studies Division at the Mount Sinai School of Medicine
- Winona LaDuke, Program Director, Honor the Earth
- Dr. Melissa Walls, (Bois Forte and Couchiching First Nation Anishinaabe) research sociologist, University of Minnesota Duluth Director of Great Lakes Hub, Johns Hopkins Center for American Indian Health, Johns Hopkins Bloomberg School of Public Health
- Chy (Native Youth)
- Tall Paul, Anishinaabe hip-hop artist
- Keith Secola Ojibwe, Native American musician
- Mike Her Many Horses, Oglala historian, Wounded Knee, South Dakota
- Melvin Lee Houston, Santee Treaty Rights Representative
- Michelle Johnson-Jennings, PhD, Ed.M. clinical health psychologist
- Dr. Karlee Fellner, Cree/Métis Associate Professor, University of Calgary otipemisiwak-nehiyawiskwew in Siksikaitsitapi territory, Indigenous Education Counseling
- Vanessa Goodthunder, Director of Cansayapi Wakanyeza Owayawa Oti Lower Sioux Indian Reservation Early Head Start
- Jesse Ventura, former Governor, State of Minnesota
- Clyde Bellecourt, co-founding the American Indian Movement
- Richie Plass, Curator Bittersweet Winds
- Tara Houska, Couchiching First Nation, tribal attorney, the National Campaigns Director of Honor the Earth
- Dr. Anton Treuer, Professor of Ojibwe at Bemidji State University
- Rep. Keith Ellison
- Rep. Betty McCollum
- Don Coyhis, President and Founder of White Bison
- Linda Eagle Speaker, Elder In Residence, MIWRC
- Joseph Marshall III, historian, writer, teacher, craftsman, administrator, actor, and public speaker
- Lester Johnson III, Ed.D., Adjunct Professor University of Montana-Missoula
- Emmy May, Red Lake Anishinaabe
- Dirk Whitebreast, member of the Sac and Fox Tribe of the Mississippi in Iowa (Meskwaki Nation), runner, entrepreneur, and a board member for the Center for Native American Youth

== Segments ==
Introduction

The film begins with a young girl telling the story of losing her brother in a shoot out with law enforcement and the trauma she has to live with everyday as an introduction to historical trauma.

People interviewed:

Rick McArthur, AIM Legal Resources, Dr. Rachel Yehuda, Professor of Psychiatry and Neuroscience, Winona LaDuke, Program Director, Honor the Earth, Dr. Melissa Walls, research sociologist, UMD, Chy (Native Youth), Music by Tall Paul and Keith Secola

First Contact

This segment of the film introduces discusses first contact which is defined as Christopher Columbus’ and his crews domination over the Indigenous peoples of the new world.

People interviewed:

Mike Her Many Horses, Oglala Historian, Melvin Lee Houston, Santee Treaty Rights, Michelle Johnson-Jennings, PhD, Ed.M. clinical health psychologist, Clyde Belecourt, co-founding the American Indian Movement, Music by Karlee Fellner

No Honor in Racism

This segment of the film documents the demonstrations outside TCF Bank Stadium during an NFL Football game tells how the NFL Washington Football team's name and the Native American mascot controversy creates racial injustice and how the use of the Native American names and images used by non-Native entities are damaging to Indigenous peoples.

People interviewed:

Vanessa Goodthunder, Director of Cansayapi Wakanyeza Owayawa Oti, Jesse Ventura, Governor, State of Minnesota, Clyde Belecourt, Dr. Melissa Walls, Richie Plass, Curator Bittersweet Winds, Tara Houska, tribal attorney, the National Campaigns Director of Honor the Earth, Dr. Anton Treuer, Professor of Ojibwe at Bemidji State, Rep. Keith Ellison, Rep. Betty McCollum

Boarding School Era

This segment of the film discusses the US and Canadian governments efforts to use ethnocide via religious boarding schools and residential schools in the United States to rid the North America Indigenous peoples of their own culture.

People interviewed:

Melvin Lee Houston, Mike Her Many Horses, Dr. Michelle Johnson-Jennings, Dr. Melissa Walls, Dr. Anton Treuer, Don Coyhis, President and Founder of White Bison, Linda Eagle Speaker, Elder In Residence, MIWRC, Joseph Marshall III, historian, writer, teacher, craftsman, administrator, actor, and public speaker

Treaty Rights

This segment follows a treaty right Leonard Thompson and his son Todd Thompson as they attempt to gather wild rice off-reservation without a permit and in violation of State law. In the 1855 Treaty with the Chippewa Indians Native tribes believe those rights exist. The 1855 Treaty signed by two Ojibwe tribes ceded a large piece of land in northwest Minnesota while retaining their rights to hunt, fish and gather on the rest of the land.

People interviewed:

Dr. Melissa Walls, Dr. Anton Treuer, Leonard Thompson, Treaty Rights advocate Music By Dorene Day Waubanewquay

Social Justice

This segment of the film addresses the root causes of health inequities and the relationship between law enforcement and Native Americans. It speaks to social workers, health care providers as well as institutions and explores how transgenerational trauma directly impacts the health outcomes and legal entanglements for Indigenous peoples in the United States.

People interviewed:

Dr. Melissa Walls, Dr. Anton Treuer, Rick McArthur, Chy (Native Youth), Lester Johnson III, Ed.D., Adjunct Professor University of Montana-Missoula

Loss and Resilience

This final segment tells the toll of lost lives due to the increase in the rates of suicide in Indian Country and the resilience necessary to survive. It follows Meskwaki distance runner Dirk Whitebreast who was awarded the Native American 40 under 40 Award in 2018 for his initiative and leadership in suicide prevention. Filmed at the Fox Cities Marathon in Appleton, Wisconsin, Dirk runs with youth from the Ho-Chunk Nation in support of suicide prevention for their community. The film also includes reflections from Emmy May of Red Lake, Minnesota who lost multiple friends and relatives due to suicide in a short period of time.

People interviewed:

Dr. Melissa Walls, Dr. Anton Treuer, Dirk Whitebreast, Emmy May, Red Lake, Lester Johnson III, Mike Her Many Horses, Dr. Rachel Yehuda

== Awards ==
In 2018 MSPIFF (the Minneapolis-St. Paul International Film Festival) selected Dodging Bullets as the winner of Minnesota Made Documentary Feature Competition and has named it as one of the "Best of Fest" films.

In 2018, the North Dakota Human Rights Film Festival awarded Dodging Bullets the Samuel Sprynczynatyk Storyteller Award: Best Documentary Feature

In 2019, BIFF (the Bigfork International Film Festival) awarded Dodging Bullets the Best Documentary award.

In 2019 the Covellite International Film Festival awarded Dodging Bullets Best Cinematography for Documentary Film.

In 2019, the Queen City Film Festival (QCFF) awarded Dodging Bullets the Audience Award Feature.
