= Kaipo Dudoit =

Native Hawaiian actor and model (born 1994)

- Born: February 7, 1994 (age 32) ʻEwa Villages, Hawaii, U.S.
- Occupations: Actor; hula dancer; massage therapist; model
- Years active: 2020–present

Kaipo Dudoit (born February 7, 1994) is an American actor, hula dancer and model. A Native Hawaiian, Dudoit is best known for his role as David Kawena in Lilo & Stitch (2025).

== Early life and career ==
Dudoit's father worked as a musician and his mother as a hula dancer. Born and raised in Honouliuli at the north end of ʻEwa, Oʻahu, he was a hula dancer for Hālau Nā Kamalei O Līlīlehua. He graduated from Kamehameha Schools and received his bachelor's degrees in Psychology and Hawaiian studies at the University of Hawaiʻi at Mānoa. While in college, Dudoit was part of the Kumu Kahua Theatre. He is a student of Kumu Hula Robert Cazimero and performed at the Merrie Monarch Festival in 2025.

He is also a licensed massage therapist by trade.

After a brief role in the TV series Magnum P.I., Dudoit made his feature film debut with My Partner (2023), which was shot in Lahaina in western Maui. The film is notably the first Hawaiian gay (boys love) film and the last film to be shot on Lahaina due to the 2023 wildfires. He played David Kawena in the 2025 live action remake of Lilo & Stitch. The original choice for the role was Kahiau Machado, who Disney had to recast after he had used racial slurs on his Spotify and Instagram accounts. To prepare for the role, Dudoit had water safety training and refined his surfing skills.

In November 2025, Dudoit portrayed Lunalilo in the play "Outlandish" for the Kumu Kahua Theatre which dramatizes his acquaintance with Victorian writer Isabella Bird starred by Julia Avilla LoPresti.

== Personal life ==
Kaipo Dudoit participated in the online project "Faces of Pride" by the Hawaiʻi LGBT Legacy Foundation, which began during the COVID-19 lockdown and featured members of the Hawaiian LGBTQIA+ community sharing their portraits and stories.

In a 2024 interview with Instinct Magazine about the film My Partner, Dudoit discussed being part of the queer community and how it was personally important for him to tell stories about queerness without needing to use "our trauma" as the forefront, but instead, to show love and peace. He also mentioned that, before being called to do the film, he watched several boys' love dramas during the pandemic on the recommendation of friends.

== Filmography ==
Key
†	Denotes films that have not yet been released

Year	Title	Role	Notes	Ref.
2023	My Partner	Pili		
2025	Lilo & Stitch	David Kawena		
2028	Lilo & Stitch 2 †	David Kawena		

=== Television ===
Year	Title	Role	Network	Notes	Ref.
2020	Magnum P.I.	Keno	CBS	Episode: "A Game of Cat and Mouse"	
2025	Rescue: HI-Surf	Andy	Fox	Two episodes: "Riptide" and "Sea Change"	
