= Julie Guyot-Diangone =

American professor

Dr. Julie Guyot-Diangone is an adjunct faculty member and professorial lecturer at the American University's School of International Service, and an assistant professor at the Howard University School of Social Work, in Washington, D.C., USA. Her research explores the role of social identity in supporting the reintegration of young people into mainstream society post-trauma, such as child refugees and the child soldiers of Sierra Leone. Her field of practice is Displaced Populations, which is frequently associated with Immigrants and Refugees. Guyot-Diangone extends this definition to include all who live along society's margin, including sex workers, street children, and single mothers managing without support. She recently presented on Resilience as part of a three-person panel at the annual Council on Social Work Education (CSWE) conference, using Freedom Summer to illustrate how the meaning one places on traumatic experiences inform care for the elderly. She is the daughter of the American Civil Rights Leader Lawrence Guyot.

== Early life and education ==
Guyot-Diangone speaks of her childhood in Washington, D.C., of what it was like growing up as the daughter of the U.S. civil rights reformer Lawrence Guyot:

"My dad would say, 'Everything is political.' So, while I call myself a social constructivist, it's really because it's not just that 'the victors write history,' they also give shape and meaning to words. This is a political act. When 'TANF recipients' become 'Welfare Queens' it is clearly with political intent. I teach to remind future frontline social workers that we link people to services, we don't save anybody. The people they serve are program participants, not beneficiaries. Afford them their dignity."

"I didn't know that going to jail was a bad thing just because every good person I know has been to jail. One of the stories about my mother was that they had all of the flatware taken away because they were banging on the cell bars making music and singing freedom songs."

She received her B.A. in liberal arts from Sarah Lawrence College in 1993, which was followed by a term of service in the United States Peace Corps, where she lived in both Western and Eastern Ukraine for two years. Afterwards, she spent an additional two years working with a small NGO that supported the social normalization and increased mental and social development of Georgia's civil war orphans. She has also worked with out-of-school youth in Tanzania, with an agency providing Education for All via radio; and, managed an educational exchange program between a D.C.-based early childhood development (ECD) center and the membership (100+) of the ECD Collective, in Dar es Salaam.

Guyot-Diangone earned her M.S.W. in 2005, while also attaining a diploma in children, youth, and development from the Institute of Social Science in The Hague. Her Ph.D. was completed in 2012, from her alma mater, the Howard University School of Social Work, following a brief stint as a visiting research fellow at Oxford University's Refugees Study Center. She now focuses on human behavior in the social environment, historical trauma, and resilience. She has stated, "I don't believe in 'brokenness, or a 'lost generation.'"

== Research ==
- Wrote the training course on Servant Leadership for the State Department-sponsored Young African Leaders Initiative (YALI).
- Co-authored entry, “Stigmatization and Labeling,” for Encyclopedia of Social Work, an NASW and University of Oxford Press publication.
- Harder than de Rock: The contribution of social role to the resilience of youth in post-conflict Sierra Leone, unpublished dissertation. Washington, DC: Howard University School of Social Work (2012)
- Katrinaville: Found objects and transformation following a natural disaster (2008). Northumbria University, Disaster and Development Centre, Community Mental Health and Wellbeing Bulletin, 1 (2), 30 - 31.
- Child and youth participation in protracted refugee situations. Children, Youth and Environment, 17 (3).
- Pushing the boundaries: Critical international perspectives on child and youth participation (2007).
- Psychosocial rehabilitation of former child soldiers (2007). London: Coalition to Stop Child Soldiers. Seen and not heard, Monday Developments, 6/12/06.
- Snell, C. & Guyot, J. (2007). Empowering young African-American street males, Journal of Human Behavior in the Social Environment. Also, In See, L. (ed.), Human Behavior in the Social Environment from an African- American Perspective (Second Edition). NY: Taylor & Francis.
- Tsunami pushes marginalized community closer to the edge, Refugee Reports (2004), 25 (9), 1.
