= Eva Fogelman =

American psychologist

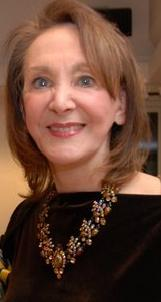
- Born: Kassel, Germany
- Education: B.A. Brooklyn College; M.A. New York University; PhD CUNY Graduate Center; Postgraduate Boston University School of Medicine; Postgraduate Boston Family Institute
- Occupations: Psychologist, writer, filmmaker, lecturer
- Spouse: Jerome Chanes
- Children: 1
- Website: https://evafogelman.com

Eva Fogelman is an American psychologist, writer, filmmaker and a pioneer in the treatment of psychological effects of the Holocaust on survivors and their descendants. She is the author of the Pulitzer Prize nominated book Conscience and Courage: Rescuers of Jews During the Holocaust and co-editor of Children During the Nazi Reign: Psychological Perspectives on the Interview Process. She is the writer and co-producer of the award-winning documentary Breaking the Silence: the Generation After the Holocaust and co-author of Children in the Holocaust and Its Aftermath: Historical and Psychological Studies of the Kestenberg Archive (2019).

== Early life and education ==
Fogelman was born in a displaced persons camp in Kassel, Germany, following World War II. She immigrated to the United States in 1959 after living in Israel. Fogelman received her bachelor's degree in psychology from Brooklyn College, her master's degree in rehabilitation counseling from New York University, and her doctoral degree from CUNY Graduate Center. She also has advanced training in family therapy from the Boston Family Institute and psychoanalytic psychotherapy training at Boston University Medical School.

== Groups for children of Holocaust Survivors ==
In 1976, while working at Harvard Medical School, Fogelman and several other psychologists were interested in starting a Jewish mental health clinic at Boston University Hillel. The result of this project was the first short-term therapy group for children of Holocaust survivors, which Fogelman co-led with her colleague Bella Savran. The inspiration for the group came from reading a dialogue between several children of Holocaust survivors published in Response; a Contemporary Jewish Review in 1975. The groups attracted young adults from a broad spectrum of the Jewish community, from those who openly embraced their Jewish identity to those who did not know that they were Jews until well into their adulthood. The groups gave participants an opportunity to learn what they had in common and what was unique to their individual family histories; it also gave them support to be able to communicate with their parents about their horrific pasts, many for the first time. In 1978, Fogelman started the first short-term group for children of Holocaust survivors in Israel at Hebrew University, where she worked with Dr. Hillel Klein and Uri Last studying the psychological impact of the Holocaust on survivors and their families in Israel.

The groundbreaking therapeutic techniques established in these groups were written about in Helen Epstein's landmark article published in the June 19, 1977 New York Times Magazine entitled "Heirs of the Holocaust", and later in her book entitled Children of the Holocaust: Conversations with Sons and Daughters of Survivors. Epstein's article articulated what many children of survivors were feeling, but could not put into words: that they felt a sense of mourning that was unacknowledged by the greater Jewish community. This realization inspired the children of Holocaust survivors to want to connect with one another, sparking a movement of second generation Holocaust survivors, as they came to be known. These groups have taken different forms, in terms of time limited versus open-ended groups, with some incorporating multiple generations, child survivors, or the third generation, and others using different modalities, such as self-help and leader-led, psychoanalytic, psychodrama, and psychodynamic psychotherapy.

== Conferences and gatherings for generations of the Holocaust ==
=== First International Conference on Children of Holocaust Survivors ===
In the summer of 1976, Eva Fogelman, Bella Savran, and Moshe Waldoks met with Rabbi Irving Greenberg, head of the National Jewish Resource Center (now the National Jewish Center for Learning and Leadership), to discuss the possibility of sponsoring a conference for second generation survivors. A huge proponent of Holocaust education and commemoration, Rabbi Greenberg was supportive of the idea and received the funds several years later to sponsor the First International Conference on Children of Holocaust Survivors, which was held on November 4–5, 1979, at Hebrew Union College in New York City. Helen Epstein was the keynote speaker. The conference attracted more than six hundred members of the second generation from throughout the United States who returned to their homes and started organizations and groups for people like themselves.

=== The First World Gathering of Holocaust Survivors ===
During this period, Fogelman was a graduate student at CUNY Graduate Center studying social and personality psychology. In 1980, when the American Gathering of Holocaust Survivors (today known as the American Gathering of Jewish Holocaust Survivors and their Descendants) started to organize the first international meeting of Holocaust survivors, they approached some second generation members including Fogelman, Menachem and Jean Bloch Rosensaft, Jeanette Friedman, and Chaim and Dina Zlotogorsky to incorporate a second generation program into the conference. In 1981, ten thousand survivors and their descendants gathered in Jerusalem. Elie Wiesel wrote an oath in Yiddish on the obligations of the legacy of the Holocaust which the second generation accepted. Fogelman was one of the founding members of The International Network of Children of Jewish Holocaust Survivors, which was founded in September 1981, following the First World Gathering. Menachem Rosensaft was founding chairman. This organization sponsored and co-sponsored major conferences for children of survivors in New York in 1984 and 1986, Los Angeles in 1987, Israel in 1988, Washington, D.C., in 1983, Philadelphia in 1985, and supported the plight of Ethiopian Jews in 1982 by hosting a rally in New York City. In 1985, during the so-called Bitburg controversy, the organization mobilized a demonstration of survivors and children of survivors to protest President Reagan's and West German Chancellor Helmut Kohl's honoring of fallen German Waffen-SS members buried at Bitburg cemetery from World War II on the same day they commemorated the mass graves of Bergen-Belsen.

== Breaking the Silence ==
In 1978, Fogelman was leading a group for children of Holocaust survivors with Dr. Henry Grunebaum in Cambridge, MA, which became the subject of the award-winning documentary Breaking the Silence: the Generation After the Holocaust (PBS 1984), directed by Dr. Edward Mason and written and co-produced by Eva Fogelman. The film received international acclaim and was shown at the Berlin Film Festival (1985), the Jerusalem and Tel Aviv Cinematheques, the American Psychiatric Association, the Jewish Museum, and the Joseph Papp Public Theater. It received a Blue Ribbon at the American Film Festival, a CINE Golden Eagle Award, and an award from the National Council on Family Relations.

== Conscience and Courage ==
While in Israel in 1981 for the First World Gathering, Fogelman started collecting data on non-Jews who rescued Jews during World War II. This project, known as the Rescuer Project, was sponsored by Dr. John Slawson of the American Jewish Committee and became her doctoral dissertation, The Rescuers: A Socio-psychological Study of Altruistic Behavior During the Nazi Era, presented in 1987 at the Graduate Center of the City University of New York. Her dedication to these courageous people led her in 1986 to co-found with Rabbi Harold Schulweis the Foundation to Sustain Righteous Christians, which in 1987 would become the Jewish Foundation for Christian Rescuers, a project of the Anti-Defamation League. The Foundation, today known as the Jewish Foundation for the Righteous, currently financially supports more than 450 non-Jewish rescuers worldwide. Fogelman organized conferences at Princeton and across the United States and internationally on the subject. Her research culminated in the Pulitzer-prize nominated book, Conscience and Courage: Rescuers of Jews during the Holocaust, published in 1994. The book also received an award from Amnesty International, a Christopher Award, and an award from the Unitarian Universalist Association. It was published in English, German (as Wir waren keine Helden: Lebensretter im Angesicht des Holocaust Motive, Geschichten, Hintergründ), and Czech (as Svĕdomí a odvaha: Zachránci Židů za holocaustu). It was a San Francisco Chronicle bestseller. Elizabeth Swados, a Tony-nominated composer, playwright, and writer, composed and performed Conscience and Courage Cantata (1994) based on the book with the United Nations Association International Choir.

== Holocaust Child Survivors ==
=== International Study of Organized Persecution of Children ===
In 1984, Fogelman joined forces with psychoanalyst Dr. Judith Kestenberg and attorney Milton Kestenberg to expand the International Study of Organized Persecution of Children, a project of Child Development Research. They began monthly meetings for child survivors of the Holocaust in New York City, which later became the National Association for Child Holocaust Survivors (N.A.C.H.O.S.). Other groups began in Los Angeles, Chicago, and other cities internationally. Kestenberg and other mental health professionals worldwide have interviewed 1,500 Jewish Holocaust child survivors, caretakers and other child witnesses from 1981 to the present. Another organization that sprung from these initial groups is the World Federation of Holocaust Survivors and their Descendants, formerly known as the World Federation of Jewish Child Survivors of the Holocaust. The archives today are housed at the Avraham Harman Institute of Contemporary Jewry at the Hebrew University of Jerusalem. Yad Vashem also has a copy of the archives. The archives have been a source for doctoral dissertations and several books and journals, including Children During the Nazi Reign: Psychological Perspectives on the Interview Process, The Last Witness and Child Survivors of the Holocaust.

=== Hidden Child Foundation ===
In 1989, Myriam Abramowicz, director and co-producer of As if it Were Yesterday, approached Fogelman, the Kestenbergs, and Jean Bloch Rosensaft with her vision to organize an international gathering of child survivors who had been hidden during the Holocaust. Hidden children were those who survived the Holocaust by being placed in convents, monasteries, orphanages, non-Jewish homes, or by hiding on their own with or without false identification in forests or in plain sight. Milton Kestenberg provided the initial funding necessary to plan the First International Gathering of Hidden Children, co-sponsored with the ADL, which happened in 1991. More than 1,600 hidden children and their families attended from all around the world. As a result, the Hidden Child Foundation was established, and local meetings and international conferences continue to this day.

== Related historical traumas ==
Fogelman has trained other mental health professionals extensively in the treatment of individuals who have suffered massive historical trauma, such as Armenians, Native Americans, African Americans, Vietnamese, Cubans, Guatemalans, Nicaraguans, El Salvadorans, and Cambodians. She co-founded and co-directed a training program with psychologist Al Brok at the Training Institute for Mental Health in New York City called "Psychotherapy with Generations of the Holocaust and Related Traumas." From 1985 to 2010, this program trained mental health professionals to treat historically traumatized populations in individual, family and group modalities. This program also sponsored the Kestenberg Holocaust Memorial Lectures from 1991 to 2003 in memory of Judith and Milton Kestenberg.

Fogelman's theories on the mourning process of the second generation of Holocaust survivors were a model for Maria Yellow Horse Brave Heart, professor at University of New Mexico and founder of the Takini Network, in her research and training of mental health professionals to work with Native Americans.

== Current projects ==
Fogelman has an active private practice in Midtown Manhattan, where she specializes in working with individuals, couples, families and groups in psychoanalytic psychotherapy. Her main areas of focus are the Holocaust and related traumas, impossible relationships, multi-generational family businesses, infertility, identity, and creativity. She also supervises mental health professionals and consults for organizations and businesses. She writes for popular as well as academic publications on a variety of topics, including sexual abuse as a weapon of war and genocide, philo-Semitism and anti-Semitism, and marital issues. Fogelman speaks frequently at academic conferences as well as to general audiences. Among other places, she has spoken at the Free University of Berlin, Hochschule für Polizei in Villingen-Schwenningen, Germany, the Hebrew University of Jerusalem, Oxford University, Jagiellonian University in Kraków, Poland, Princeton, Yale, Harvard, Florida Atlantic University, University of Michigan, University of Oregon, and in Stockholm. She has written for Psychology Today, Lilith, The Jewish Daily Forward, Baltimore Jewish Times, The Boston Globe, the Congressional Record, the Jewish Telegraphic Agency, Moment magazine, American Jewish History, Tikkun, Psychoanalytic Review, Congress Monthly, Holocaust and Genocide Studies, and Nashim: A Journal of Jewish Women's Studies and Gender Issues, among others. She has been a member of the boards of iVolunteer, Child Development Research, the Hadassah-Brandeis Institute, the American Friends of the Counseling Center for Women in Israel, the Training Institute of Mental Health, the Remember the Women Institute, the Sacred Grounds Foundation, and Beit Rabban Day School. She is an adviser to the United States Holocaust Memorial Museum and Vice President of the American Gathering of Jewish Holocaust Survivors and their Descendants. She is also on the Editorial Advisory Board of the Hidden Child Foundation Newsletter.

She is currently working on a book with Peace Sullivan entitled The Transference Trap about unconscious factors that affect intimate relationships and how to discover the distortions caused by these influences.
