= Yehudit Sasportas =

Israeli artist

Yehudit Sasportas יהודית סספורטס
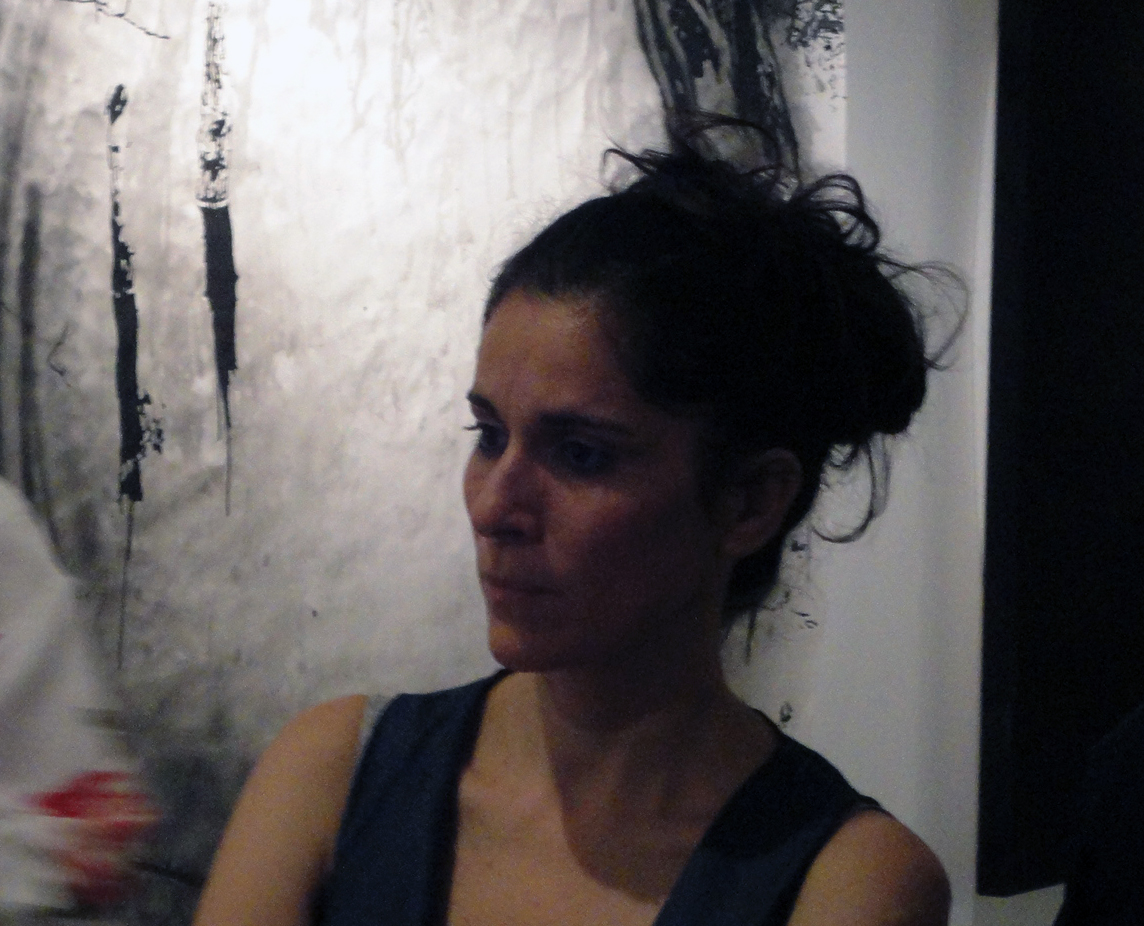
- Yehudit Sasportas (2013)
- Born: 1969 (age 56–57); Ashdod, Israel
- Known for: Sculptor, video artist
- Movement: Israeli art
- Spouse: Thomas Hübl

Yehudit Sasportas (Hebrew: יהודית סספורטס; born 1969) is an Israeli artist. She is active in Israel and Germany.

== Biography ==
Yehudit Sasportas was born in Ashdod in 1969. She earned a B.F.A in 1993 and an M.F.A. in 1999 at the Bezalel Academy of Art and Design in Jerusalem, and also studied at the Cooper Union in New York in 1993. In her early works, for example, "Cradle" (1991) and "Trash Can Scale" (1996), she created three-dimensional structures based on images of household objects. Her first major work to be shown outside of Israel at Deitch Projects in New York, "The Carpenter and the Seamstress" (2000), focuses on the architectural project of her parents apartment in a housing project in Ashdod. In it, she created a large installation from dimensions that combined sculpture and drawing. Building on this work, "By the River, 2002" was displayed at the Berkeley Art Museum in 2002. In the 2000s, her works began to include images from nature, mainly forests and swamps, and concrete and metaphorical dimensions. In addition, she began to work in the field of video.

She was the representative of Israel in Art Biennale in Istanbul in 1999, and at the Venice Biennale in 2007 with the show "The Guardians of the Threshold". In 2004/2005, she was an artist-in-residence at Künstlerhaus Bethanien in Berlin.

== Awards and recognition ==
- Ingeborg Bachmann Scholarship, 1997
- Nathan Gottesdiener Foundation prize, 1999
- Zila Yaron Prize, 2024
