= Larry Long (singer-songwriter) =

American singer-songwriter (born 1951)

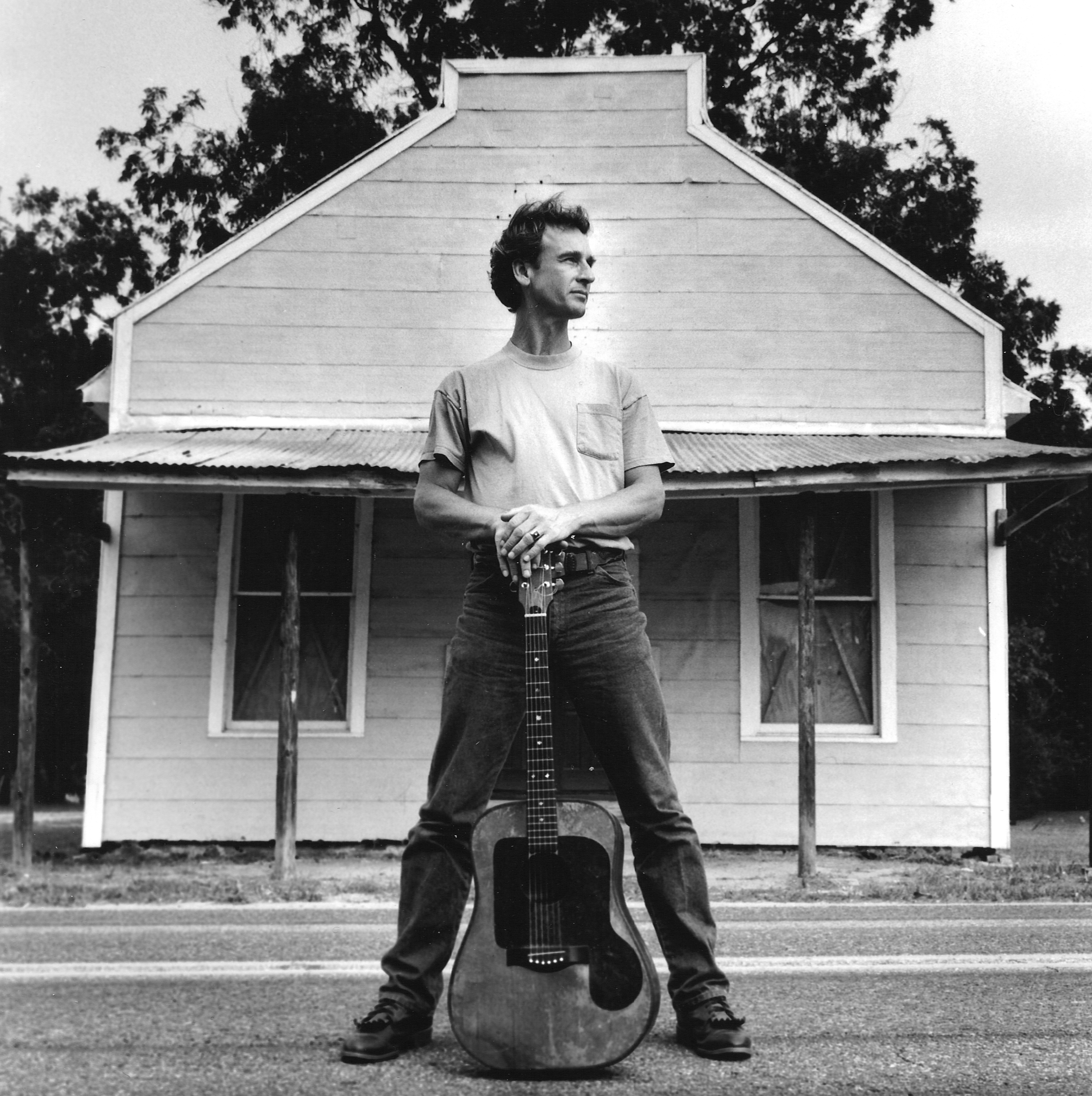
- Larry Long standing with guitar
- Born: 1951 (age 74–75); Des Moines, Iowa, U.S.
- Occupation: Singer-songwriter
- Awards: Bush Artist Fellowship; Pope John XXIII Award; Spirit of Crazy Horse Award
- Musical career
- Instruments: Vocals; guitar
- Website: larrylong.org

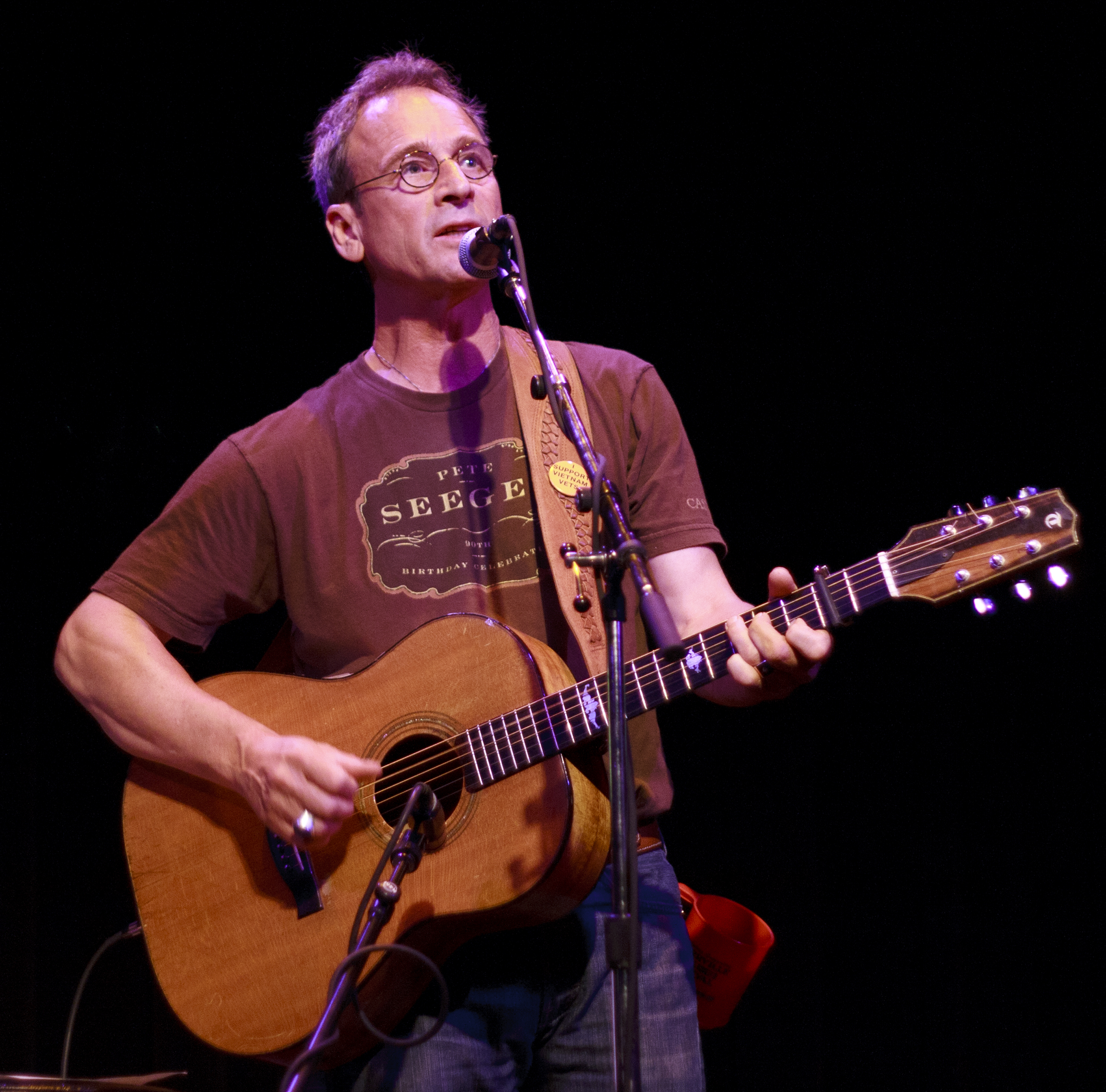
Larry Long at the Cedar Cultural Center, Minneapolis 2010

Larry Long (born 1951 in Des Moines, Iowa) is an American singer-songwriter. Author Studs Terkel called him "a true American Troubadour." Long has dedicated his career to celebrating everyday heroes through music, writing songs that highlight the lives of community builders and history makers. His work spans rural Alabama, Lakota communities, and struggling Midwest farmers.

== Early life and influences ==
Long was born in Des Moines, Iowa, into a working-class family. His grandfather left school after the sixth grade to work in the coal mines of Missouri and later moved to Des Moines, where he operated a fish market. Long worked in the fish market as a child, which brought him into contact with people from different backgrounds, including local Jewish and African-American communities. His family volunteered in homeless shelters during their free time. After retiring, his grandfather became a street preacher and working-class poet, emphasizing a strong ethic of human decency.

When Long was about ten years old, his father, a coffee salesman, was transferred to Minnesota, and the family moved to St. Louis Park. Two years after the move, Long's father died at age thirty-six, leaving Long and his two sisters to be raised by their mother. The family struggled financially but received support from community members, such as grocery store owners, friends, neighbors, and members of his mother's church. The early loss of his father had a significant impact on Long, shaping his outlook on life.

Long's musical foundation came from his upbringing in Baptist churches in Des Moines, where he listened to hymns. His mother played piano, and his father sang around the house and listened to popular singers, while Long preferred contemporary artists. Through Bob Dylan, Long discovered Woody Guthrie and felt a strong connection to Guthrie's life and music. Reading Guthrie's autobiography, Bound for Glory, motivated Long to pursue a similar path, focusing on honoring working-class people and their stories through music.

Not long after his twentieth birthday, Long left Minnesota, hitchhiked across the country, and traveled with a fiddle player. He wrote songs inspired by his experiences and the people he met, developing a deep loyalty to working-class communities. These early experiences influenced his commitment to giving voice to everyday people and shaped the direction of his musical career.

== Career ==
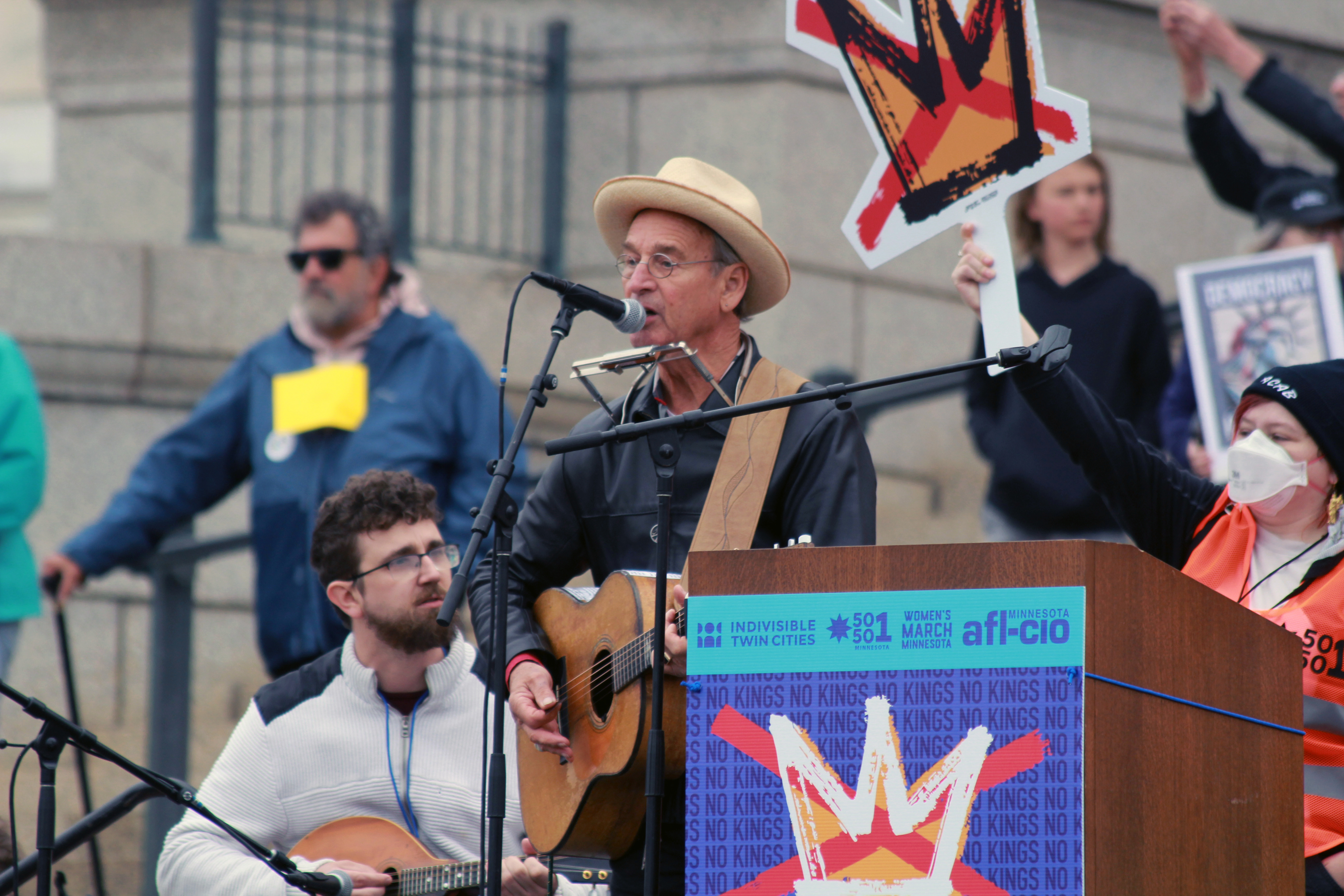
Larry Long performing with son at No Kings! protest, Minnesota State Capitol, June 14, 2025

Long's work is rooted in the troubadour tradition. He has written and performed ballads celebrating community builders and history makers. While in his early 20s, Long wrote a song for farmers fighting a high voltage power line Pope County Blues and traveled with a tractorcade of family farmers to Washington, D.C. to demonstrate for fair prices. It was then he met Pete Seeger, who inspired him to organize the Mississippi River Revival, a decade-long campaign to clean up the Mississippi river. In 1989, he assembled the first hometown tribute to Woody Guthrie in Okemah, Oklahoma, which has evolved into the annual Woody Guthrie Folk Festival. In 2001 Long sang for Rosa Parks at the 45th anniversary of the Montgomery bus boycott.

A Smithsonian Folkways recording artist, Long has sung at Awesome Africa Festival (South Africa) and Winnipeg Folk Festival (Canada)]. In May 2009, he performed at Madison Square Garden with Joan Baez and others for Pete Seeger's 90th Birthday Celebration.

== Elders' Wisdom, Children's Song ==
In 1989, while working with communities in rural Alabama, Long created an intergenerational process called Elders' Wisdom, Children's Song. The intergenerational program developed connects community elders with schoolchildren through oral history and music. In this program, elders visit classrooms to share their life stories and experiences. Students, with guidance from Long and their teachers, collaborate to turn these stories into original songs. The process concludes with a public event where students perform the songs and the community recognizes the elders' contributions.

Since its inception, the program has recorded the life stories of more than 500 elders from 65 communities in 25 states. Participants have included individuals from a variety of cultural, economic, and geographic backgrounds. The stories and songs are archived in print, audio, and video formats. The program is designed to foster understanding and respect between generations. Students learn about the lives of elders in their community, while elders see their experiences shared with younger generations. The initiative has been implemented in schools and communities in several states, including Minnesota, Alabama, and South Dakota. Elders' Wisdom, Children's Song is supported by the nonprofit Community Celebration of Place, which works to document oral histories and promote community engagement through music and storytelling. The program continues to be used in new communities and schools around the United States.

== Awards ==
Long has received the Bush Artist Fellowship (1995), the Pope John XXIII Award (2001, Viterbo University) and the Spirit of Crazy Horse Award (2002, Reclaiming Youth International). As a film producer, Longs work on the documentary Dodging Bullets—Stories from Survivors of Historical Trauma, has been awarded Best Documentary at the Minneapolis-St. Paul International Film Festival, the Bigfork International Film Festival, and the North Dakota Human Rights Film Festival awarded Dodging Bullets the Samuel Sprynczynatyk Storyteller Award: Best Documentary Feature.

== Discography (partial listing) ==
- Sweet Thunder (1987, Flying Fish Records, produced with Billy Peterson).
- It Takes a Lot of People (1989, Flying Fish Records).
- Troubadour (1993, Flying Fish Records)
- Living in a Rich Man's World (1995, Rounder/Atomic Theory Recordings).
- The Psalms (1992, Stellar Records).
- Hauling Freight, No Fences (1995, produced with Barry Kimm).
- Here I Stand, Elders' Wisdom, Children's Song (1997, Smithsonian Folkways).
- Run For Freedom (1997, Flying Fish Records, produced by Marian Moore).
- Well May the World Go (2000, Smithsonian Folkways)
- I Will Be Your Friend: Songs and Activities for Young Peacemakers (2006).
- Sacred Sites Songs (2007)
- Don't Stand Still (2011, Cereus Records)
- Dove With Claws (2016, Cereus Records)
- Slow Night (2018, Cereus Records)

== Songbooks and curriculum (partial listing) ==
- New Folk Favorites (Hal Leonard Publishing).
- Elders' Wisdom, Children's Song Guidebook (Sing-Out Publishing, 1999).
- I Will Be Your Friend: Songs and Activities For Young Peacemakers (Southern Poverty Law Center, 2003).
- Be Kind to All That Live: Elders' Wisdom, Children's Song. Songbook, Volume 1 (Community Celebration of Place, 2006)
- Just Be Who You Are: Elders' Wisdom, Children's Song. Songbook, Volume II (Community Celebration of Place, 2008)

== Sources ==
- Deep Community: Adventures in the Modern Folk Underground, Scott Alarik, p. 131. Black Wolf Press. 2003
- "Four Part Harmony" p. 50-53 from The Compassionate Rebel: Energized by Anger, Motivated by Love, Bert E. Barlowe, p. 50-53. Triangle Park Creative Press. 2002
- Powerline: the First Battle of American's Energy War, Senator Paul Wellstone and Barry M. Caspar, p. 24. University of Massachusetts Press. 1983
- Featured interview with Larry Long, Sing Out! Magazine, V.33. No. 4, Summer 1988
- Blue Guitar Highways, Paul Metsa, pp. 236–237. University of Minnesota Press. 2011
