= My Partner =

- Directed by: Keli’i Grace
- Written by: Lance D. Collins; Alexander Deedy; Sean Dunnington
- Screenplay by: Alexander Deedy; Sean Dunnington
- Produced by: Keli’i Grace; Jess T. Johnston
- Starring: Jayron Munoz; Kaipo Dudoit
- Cinematography: Brock Ladd
- Production company: KSG Films
- Distributed by: Random Media
- Release date: September 8, 2023 (Honolulu Rainbow International Film Festival)
- Running time: 98 minutes
- Country: United States
- Languages: English; Tagalog; Hawaiian

My Partner is a 2023 American romantic drama film directed by Keli’i Grace and starring Jayron Munoz and Kaipo Dudoit. The film revolves around intercultural conflict between Hawaiian and Filipino immigrants and a developing romantic relationship between two high school seniors. It was described as the first Hawaiian gay film and the last film to be shot in Lahaina due to the 2023 wildfires.

== Plot ==
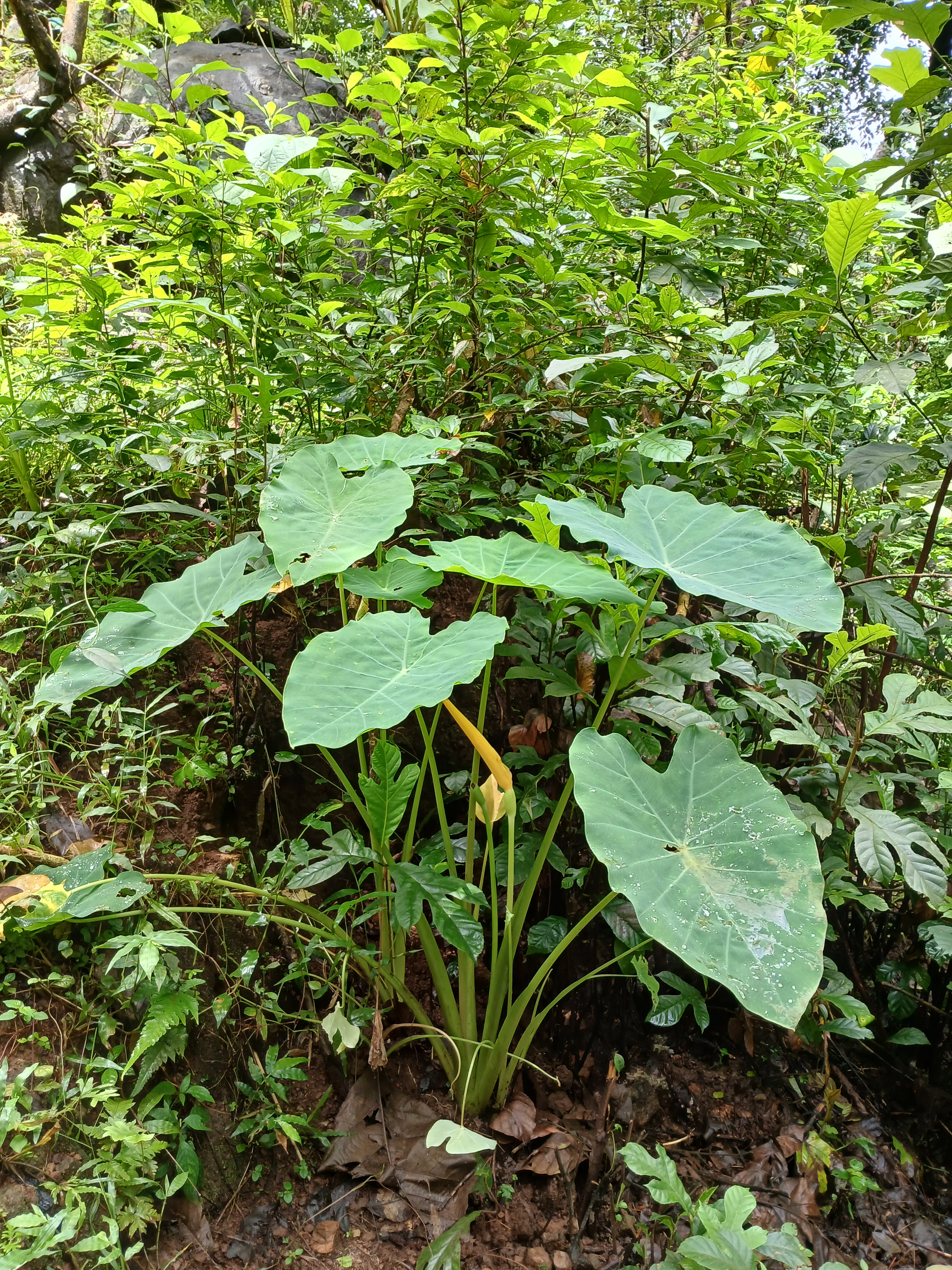
Leaves of the Taro plant (Colocasia esculenta) called Kalo in Hawaii

In Lahaina, Hawaii, two groups of Lahainaluna High School seniors, three native Hawaiians and three Filipino immigrants from Ilocos, Philippines. The two groups have a dispute, when Zack (Dan Francis Rodriguez) is confronted by Kona (Kaleo Pinto) about fishing for the endangered ʻOʻopu. Two of the boys in the groups are partnered by their social studies' teacher, Ms. Thomas (Justine Albert) and required to complete a final project for class, researching and preparing a food dish. Edmar (Jayron Munoz), the Filipino, hesitantly encourages Pili (Kaipo Dudoit), the native Hawaiian, to work with him so they can pass the class.

After some further conflict about cultural differences, Pili decides to take Edmar to meet his family and teach him about Hawaiian culture, their way of life, and their respect for conservation of nature. Edmar bonds with Pili while loʻi kalo farming, making a traditional lei, experiencing a lūʻau, and even drinking ʻawa from a kanoa. At the request of his mother, Pili takes Edmar to mauka (the mountains) to show him about their wai (freshwater). Pili teachers Edmar about Hawaii’s environmental damage from historic plantations (sugarcane and pineapple), how families lives were ruined, and why conserving Hawaii’s ecosystems are important. During his weekend with Pili, Edmar experiences attraction. Pili maintains his even-keeled disposition, but expresses his attraction with subtle touches of the hand and cuddling with Edmar after he falls asleep.

Having shared more personal histories and future desires, the two start spending more time together. Pili builds a closer friendship with Edmar's friends, Zack and Cedric (Bryant de Venecia) as well, bonding over a FIFA video game. As Edmar struggles with his attraction to Pili, he breaks up with his long distance girlfriend from Ilocos, leading to Pili breaking up with his girlfriend shortly after.

Edmar and Pili have a romantic interaction as they get closer, but get caught in the middle of more conflict between Zack and Kona that culminates in a physical altercation, resulting in tension between the two. Eventually, they meet up to finish their project, plotting a way to be near each other despite the fraught friendship group dynamics. On a beach camping trip, all six boys unite when they defend their beach against polluting haoles (non-native tourists). This leads to Edmar and Pili have a chance to spend time together, resulting in their first kiss and an intimate night spent together in a tent.

The story concludes with both friends groups united, having shared stories about their ways of life, getting a better cultural understanding of one another. Pili and Edmar successfully present their final project to the class, having made poi and kalamay embracing both of their cultural heritages. In the end, a romantic embrace on the beach implies a relationship has formed between the two.

== Cast ==
- Kaipo Dudoit as Pili
- Jayron Munoz as Edmar
- Dan Francis Rodriguez as Zack
- Bryant de Venecia as Cedric
- Kaleo Pinto as Kona
- A'alona Monteilh as Haku, Pili's cousin
- Alaka'i Lastimado as Jack, Pili's half Filipino uncle
- Malelega Lauano as Sina
- Kau'i Kaina as Pili's mother
- Justine Albert as Ms. Thomas
- Charieze Lianne Cacayorin as Maymay

== Production ==
The cast and crew of the film are from Hawaii and the cast are all newcomers. The entire film was shot in Hawaii, with the producers making sure to showcase Hawaii's culture and make sure the film benefited the community.

== Music ==
Three songs from Tribe Mafia (Sound of a Heartbreak, Take Me, and Feel the Rush) are featured in the film along with Chances by JULÉ. Many other Hawai'ian artists were featured as well such as Laʻamea Paleka (I'm Still Finding Love), Ahumanu, Keauhou, Hoʻopono Wong, Nā Wai ʻEhā, Kalena Delima & Kalaʻe Parish, Ikaika Blackburn, Kamaka Kukona, Kamalei Kawaʻa, Kealiʻi Reichel, Eugene Tunac Marquez, Iwalani, Poʻokela Wood, Nāpua Greig, Pewa, and U.H. Timpuyog & Friends.

== Reception ==
Devin Hung reviewing the film at the HIFF wrote, "MY PARTNER is a cute and necessary addition to the Boys Love genre. By showing two boys of Pacific Island heritage falling in love, the film is saying that everyone, no matter what cultural background you come from, should be able to be in a relationship that makes them happy".

== Accolades and festivals ==
Year	Award	Category	Recipient	Result	Ref.
2023	L.A. Asian Pacific Film Festival	Audience Award (Narrative)	My Partner	Won	
2023	Mpumalanga International Film Festival	Best Foreign Film	My Partner	Won	
2023	Honolulu Rainbow International Film Festival	Grand Jury Award	My Partner	Won	
2023	LGBTQ+ Unbordered International Film Festival	Outstanding Excellence Award (Romance)	My Partner	Won	
2023	San Antonio QFest LGBT International Film Festival	Lily Tomlin Memorial Award	My Partner	Won	
2024	Hawaiʻi International Film Festival	Honorable Mention, Made in Hawaiʻi (Feature)	My Partner	Won	

Additionally, the film was selected to be a part of the following film festivals in 2023:

- Hālāwai Film Festival
- 16th Festival de Cine Indígena de Barcelona (IndiFest)
- Palm Springs LGBTQ+ Film Festival
- Beijing Queer Film Festival
- Golden Isles Film Festival
- San Diego Filipino Film Festival
