= Kestenberg Movement Profile =

In psychology, the Kestenberg Movement Profile (KMP) is a system of movement observation and analysis that therapists use to appraise individuals include fetuses.

The KMP is structured as a psychological profile attained through notating and graphing an individual's body movement. As Loman and Foley wrote in 1996, “...experiences get stored in the body and are reflected in body movement."

KMP was developed by Dr. Judith Kestenberg and her colleagues.

== Description ==
KMP is organized to reflect two lines of development.

- System I is focused on the tension flow-effort line of development describing movement dynamics.
- System II, the shape-flow shaping developmental line, describes relational development and the structure of movements

The diagrams of each system are arranged on the basis of observed patterns of development so that earlier qualities such as pre-efforts are followed on the KMP page by more mature qualities such as efforts. Within this structure there are eight frequency diagrams dedicated to specific categories of movement qualities. For example, there is a diagram of efforts. Looking at that diagram we can see the frequency of specific effort qualities used by a mover. People have their own unique movement quality preferences. So, although a punch often involves direct, strong, and accelerated qualities, but one could punch using an indirect quality of movement.

The KMP study group discovered that as infants mature, their movement repertoires expand and certain qualities become more or less frequent based on their developmental phase and individual personality and experiences.

A 2007 study concluded that the KMP was useful as a theoretical lens and methodological tool for assessing psychological phenomena in adults, as well. Koch also conducted a study in 2014 on the utility of the KMP concluding that there was a significant effect of dynamic movements (indulging versus fighting rhythms) on attitudes and affects in adults.

== Methodological approaches ==
The KMP can serve as a descriptive device, portraying the frequency of use of specified qualities of movement without reference to any theoretical orientation. However, the analyst may also use the KMP in developing hypotheses or predictions based on the descriptive data. Among the various approaches are:

- Evaluating how the individual fits into the developmental pattern that is typically found amongst the person's subculture.
- Evaluating how movement qualities of one individual are used in harmonious and clashing combinations.
- Comparing KMP's of a dyad (two individuals), to evaluate how their movement patterns interrelate.
- Analyzing the KMP in relation to the meta-psychological profile developed by Anna Freud, with its strong emphasis on development.

Presently, individual researchers, therapists, anthropologists and movement specialists use the KMP through the lens of their own frameworks.

== Culture and context ==
Frances Labarre (2001), Christine Caldwell (2010) Kestenberg Amighi (1990) and others have pointed to the importance cultural influences in the study and analysis of movement patterns.

We can make a preliminary assessment of KMP cultural bias on its different levels of application. As a purely descriptive instrument, there is a minimal degree of cultural bias. It may be that certain qualities of movement are excluded from the KMP that reflects the culture of its originators. However, the focus on elementary qualities of movement that serve universal functions, such as sucking, biting, urinating and giving birth, enhances its degree of universality and equivalence in many diverse cultural settings.

However, once one goes beyond description, the level of cultural bias increases. One of the cultural judgments underlying the KMP is that access to a broad and fairly balanced range of movement patterns in adults offers greater adaptability and health to movers, regardless of cultural context. Once one begins to interpret or evaluate a movement profile, in comparison to developmental norms or is seeking psychological meaning, cultural influences become more of a concern.

The KMP is best applied in cultural settings for which developmental norms are available and where members of the culture participate in uncovering, untangling and revealing cultural specific movement/meaning associations. For example, Kestenberg Amighi (2008) compared movement related metaphors in eight different languages. She found that such metaphors tend to be quite similar within several European languages, but vary much more as one crosses into more historically separated languages and cultures. Some meanings that might appear to an English language speaker as fundamental, are, in fact culturally shaped.

For example, in English we often associate shrinking in shape i.e. making oneself small with feelings of insignificance or subordination and growing or making oneself big with feelings of pride and/or importance. However, in Persian, for example, the former does not make any sense while the latter is widely used.

== Clinical applications ==
The KMP system is taught at the graduate level to dance/movement therapists as a tool for clinical assessment and intervention for clients across the lifespan, and has been used as a research tool in identifying nonverbal behaviors of infant-parent dyads and maternal depression

Small infants have wide repertoires of movement qualities, each in theory, coming to greater maturity and prominence as each developmental phase unfolds. However, the general developmental pattern described in the KMP, is expressed in each individual in varied forms reflecting individual differences. Temperament, cultural influences, and later experiences become embodied over time and lead to very individual styles of movement.

The KMP offers the therapist and mover a window to understanding the predilections that exist and offer opportunities to develop comfortable expression of a wider range of movement patterns if desired. It is believed, following the work of dance/movement therapists, that such expanded movement repertoire can have healing implications—both on physiological and psychological levels. How much the movement qualities are expressed or fade is a product of individual temperament, experiences, and context, as well as developmental age. Thus the KMP analyst,(a dance/movement therapist or psychotherapist), looks for some degree of fit with developmental phase, some degree of balance of the movement qualities, and some degree of matched harmonious patterning within a normative pattern for that individual's culture.
