= Thomas Hübl =

Austrian spiritual teacher and author

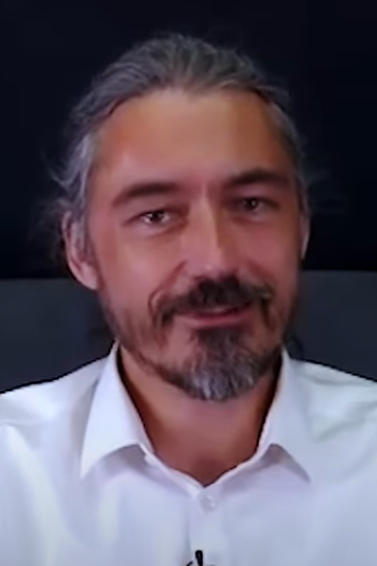
- Thomas Hübl, 2021
- Born: Thomas Hübl; 1971 (age 54–55)
- Occupations: businessperson; teacher; author
- Known for: Collective trauma work
- Spouse: Yehudit Sasportas
- Website: thomashuebl.com

Thomas Hübl (born in 1971) is an Austrian teacher and author known for his work in the field of collective trauma.

== Biography ==
Thomas Hübl was born in Austria. He worked as a paramedic while studying medicine at the University of Vienna. As a student at the university, he started practicing meditation. During his studies, Hübl was introduced to the works of Wilhelm Reich and to the teachings of spiritual teachers such as Ken Wilber and Ramana Maharshi. He later began to practice various methods of yoga, meditation and introspection.

At age 26, Hübl decided to devote himself to introspection in a 4-year-long independent retreat, in the Czech Republic, where he would meditate for long periods and investigate the nature of consciousness. According to Hübl, it was a time for self inspection and purification. In the early 1990s, he left his studies at the university to focus on teaching meditation and mindfulness.

In the early 2000s, Hübl held meditation and mindfulness retreats both in Austria and Germany. These included large-scale healing events for Israelis and Germans to address the collective wounds of The Holocaust. When he began holding these retreats, he noticed that many participants began to voice some of their deeply held intergenerational wounds stemming from the second World War.

As these programs evolved over the next two decades, Hübl developed the Collective Trauma Integration Process for working with individual, ancestral, and collective trauma. This model promotes a safe exploration of sharing and reflection, guided by a facilitation process that supports openness, transparent communication, mindful awareness, and refined relational competencies. Transparent communication is a practice of what Hübl describes as radical presence and honesty that welcomes the full range of human experience without fixing it as personal identity, with a commitment to awakening in service of the whole, i.e. not limited to individualistic aspirations for achievement, satisfaction, or self-improvement. He has been teaching people how to understand and integrate both the subtle and more acute forms of trauma that impact societies and has helped hundreds of thousands of people spark dialogue and work toward restoring some of humanity’s worst transgressions such as colonialism, gender traumatization, and racism.

In 2008, he founded the Academy of Inner Science. Along with his wife, Yehudit Sasportas he also founded the nonprofit The Pocket Project in 2016, which educates the public on the impact of collective traumas and trains professionals to facilitate events focused on healing. He is a visiting scholar at Harvard University’s Wyss Institute.

Hübl lives in Israel with his family since 2015.

== Books ==
- Hübl, Thomas (2016). The Evolutionary Path: Essential Principles for Awakening in the World. Sounds True. ISBN 978-1-62203-533-5.
- Hübl, Thomas; Jordan Avritt, Julie (17 November 2020). Healing Collective Trauma: A Process for Integrating Our Intergenerational and Cultural Wounds. Sounds True. ISBN 978-1683647379.
- Hübl, Thomas; Breidenbach, Stephan (27 February 2022). Modern Mystic - Principles for living consciously: Thomas Hübl In conversation with Stephan Breidenbach. Independently published. ISBN 979-8782899370.
- Hübl, Thomas (12 September 2023). Attuned: Practicing Interdependence to Heal Our Trauma―and Our World. Sounds True. ISBN 978-1649631565.
- Hübl, Thomas; Schwartz, Richard (2 December 2025). Releasing Our Burdens: A Guide to Healing Individual, Ancestral, and Collective Trauma. Boulder, CO: St. Martin's Essentials/Sounds True. ISBN 978-1-64963-410-8.
