= Maria Yellow Horse Brave Heart =

Native American social worker and educator (born 1953)

Maria Yellow Horse Brave Heart-Jordan
- Born: Maria Yellow Horse Brave Heart; October 1953 (age 73)
- Citizenship: Oglala Sioux Tribe, American
- Education: Columbia University
- Occupations: Social worker Associate professor
- Years active: 1973–present
- Organization: Takini Network
- Known for: Historical Trauma in indigenous populations Takini Network
- Children: 1 daughter
- Awards: 2001 Center for Mental Health Services grant award for Lakota Regional Community Action Grant Historical Trauma

Maria Yellow Horse Brave Heart is a Native American social worker, associate professor and mental health expert. She is best known for developing a model of historical trauma for the Lakota people, which would eventually be expanded to encompass indigenous populations the world over. She is Hunkpapa/Oglala Lakota.

== Research ==
In 2000, Brave Heart published the article, "Wakiksuyapi: Carrying the Historical Trauma of the Lakota." Using the historical trauma research conducted in survivors of the Holocaust, Brave Heart would identify a comparable cluster of events correlated with massive group trauma across generations, including the 1890 Wounded Knee Massacre and the forced removal of children to federal boarding schools. She conceptualized the current form of historical trauma in the 1980s as a way to comprehend what she observed as many Native Americans being unable to fulfill "the American Dream". Her most significant findings came in a cluster of six symptoms:

1. 1st Contact: life shock, genocide, no time for grief, a Colonization Period in which the introduction of disease and alcohol occurred, and traumatic events such as Wounded Knee Massacre.
2. Economic competition: which resulted in loss from spiritual and tangible dimensions.
3. The occurrence of Invasion/War Period, which involved extermination and refugee symptoms.
4. A Subjugation/Reservation Period where confinement and translocation occur, a relationship of forced dependency on oppressor is formed, and a lack of security occur.
5. Boarding School Period: in which the family system is destroyed, beatings, rape, and prohibition of Native language and religion ensue. The lasting effect being ill-preparation for parenting, identity confusion.
6. Forced Relocation and Termination Period: transfer to urban areas, prohibition of religious freedom, racism and being viewed as second class; loss of governmental system and community.

She also proposed a three-pronged intervention mode: education, sharing the effects of trauma and grief resolution through collective mourning and healing.

Since 1976, Brave Heart has worked directly in the field to gather information on the impact of historical trauma within the indigenous communities. These groups include the Lakota in South Dakota, multiple tribes in New Mexico, and populations of indigenous and Latinos in Denver, New Mexico and New York. Dr. Brave Heart is also responsible for hosting and presenting over 175 presentations on subject matter related to historical trauma as well as training numerous tribes across the United States and First Nations populations in the country of Canada.

In 1992, Brave Heart established the Takini Network, a Native nonprofit organization dedicated to healing the wounds inflicted on Native Americans through the experiences of intergenerational trauma, located in Rapid City, South Dakota.

== Career ==
Maria Yellow Horse Brave Heart is known for developing a model of historical trauma, historical unresolved grief theory and interventions in indigenous peoples. Brave Heart earned her Master of Science from Columbia University School of Social Work in 1976.

Brave Heart returned to school in 1990 after working in the field of social work, and in 1995, she earned her doctorate in clinical social work from the Smith College School for Social Work. The dissertation was entitled, "The Return to the Sacred Path: Healing from Historical Trauma and Historical Unresolved Grief Among the Lakota." Dr. Brave Heart was a tenured faculty member at the University of Denver Graduate School of Social Work and Coordinator of the Native People's Curriculum Project, which operated in the Denver and the Four Corners region and covered the Navajo and Ute reservations. In addition to a career as an associate professor at the Columbia University School of Social Work, Dr. Brave Heart also served as a clinical intervention research team member at the Hispanic Treatment Program, located at the New York State Psychiatric Institute/Columbia University Medical School.

The unresolved grief intervention developed by Brave Heart was considered an outstanding model, one which won a special minority Center for Mental Health Services grant award for Lakota Regional Community Action Grant Historical Trauma in 2001. Dr. Brave Heart was also responsible for the incorporation of techniques designed to intervene and enhance reservation parenting through a number of successful grants. She was also known for the coordination and directing of several Models for Indigenous Survivors of Historical Trauma: A Multicultural Dialogue Among Allies Conferences between 2001 and 2004, and served as both member and host of conferences for the International Society for Traumatic Stress Studies. Dr. Brave Heart was also on the board of directors for the Council on Social Work Education and acted as an adviser/consultant to the National Indian Country Child Trauma Center.

Brave Heart currently serves as a research associate professor at the University of New Mexico Department of Psychiatry. She also serves as director of Native American, Disparities Research and Community Behavioral Health. Maria has areas of interest which include indigenous collective trauma, grief and loss, historical trauma, healing intervention and mental health in indigenous populations, and substance use disorders and co-occurring mental health disorders in indigenous populations.

== Bibliography ==
- Brave Heart, M.Y.H., Chase, J., Myers, J.O., Elkins, J., Skipper, C.L.S., Mootz, J., Waldorf, V.A. (2020) Iwankapiya American Indian pilot clinical trial: Historical trauma and group interpersonal psychotherapy. Psychotherapy (Chic). 2020 06; 57(2):184-196.
- Brave Heart, M.Y.H., Chase, J., Elkins, J., Nanez, J., Martin, J., & Mootz, J. (2016) Women finding the way: American Indian women leading intervention research in Native communities. American Indian and Alaska Native Mental Health Research Journal. 23(3), 24-47.
- Brave Heart, M.Y.H., Lewis-Fernández, R, Beals, J, Hasin, D, Sugaya, L, Wang, S, Grant, BF., Blanco, C. (2016) Psychiatric Disorders and Mental Health Treatment in American Indians and Alaska Natives: Results of the National Epidemiologic Survey on Alcohol and Related Conditions. Social Psychiatry and Psychiatric Epidemiology. First online May 2, 2016, pp.1-14.
- Brave Heart, M.Y.H., Elkins, J., Tafoya, G., Bird, D., & Salvador (2012). Wicasa Was'aka: Restoring the traditional strength of American Indian males. American Journal of Public Health, 102 (S2), 177-183.
- Brave Heart, M.Y.H., Chase, J., Elkins, J., & Altschul, D.B. (2011). Historical trauma among Indigenous Peoples of the Americas: Concepts, research, and clinical considerations. Journal of Psychoactive Drugs, 43 (4), 282-290.
- Brave Heart, M.Y.H. & Deschenie, T. (2006). Resource guide: Historical trauma and post-colonial stress in American Indian populations. Tribal College Journal of American Indian Higher Education, 17 (3), 24-27.
- Brave Heart, M.Y.H. (2003). The historical trauma response among Natives and its relationship with substance abuse: A Lakota illustration. Journal of Psychoactive Drugs, 35(1), 7-13.
- Brave Heart, M.Y.H., (2001) Clinical assessment with American Indians. In: Fong R, Furuto S, editors. Culturally competent practice: Practice skills, interventions, and evaluation. Reading, MA: Longman Publishers; 2001a. pp. 163–177.
- Brave Heart, M.Y.H., (2001) Clinical interventions with American Indians. In: Fong R, Furuto S, editors. Culturally competent practice: Practice skills, interventions, and evaluation. Reading, MA: Longman Publishers; 2001b. pp. 285–298.
- Brave Heart, M.Y.H., (2000) "Wakiksuyapi: Carrying the historical trauma of the Lakota." Tulane Studies in Social Welfare, 21(22): 245–66
- Brave Heart, M.Y.H., (1999) Gender differences in the historical trauma response among the Lakota. Journal of Health and Social Policy. 1999a;10(4):1–21.
- Brave Heart, M.Y.H., (1999) Oyate Ptayela: Rebuilding the Lakota Nation through addressing historical trauma among Lakota parents. Journal of Human Behavior and the Social Environment. 1999b;2(1/2):109–126.
- Brave Heart, M.Y.H, DeBruyn L. (1998) The American Indian Holocaust: healing historical unresolved grief. Am Indian Alsk Native Ment Health Res. 1998;8(2):56-78.
- Brave Heart, M.Y.H., (1998) The return to the sacred path: Healing the historical trauma response among the Lakota. Smith College Studies in Social Work. 1998;68:287–305.
- Brave Heart-Jordan, M.Y.H. (1995). The return to the sacred path: Healing from historical trauma and historical unresolved grief among the Lakota. Dissertation Abstracts International Section A: Humanities & Social Sciences, 56(9-A), 3742.

== See also ==
- Historical trauma
