= Judith Kestenberg =

Austrian psychoanalyst

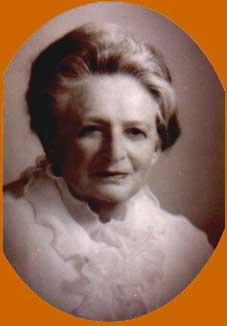
- Born: March 17, 1910; Tarnów, Austria-Hungary
- Died: January 16, 1999 (aged 88)
- Education: MD University of Vienna
- Occupations: Psychiatrist, Psychoanalyst
- Notable work: Sexuality, Body Movement and the Rhythms of Development (Aronson, 1995); The Last Witness: The Child Survivor of the Holocaust (American Psychiatric Press, 1996), Children During the Nazi Reign: Psychological Perspective on the Interview Process (Greenwood, 1994).
- Spouse: Milton Kestenberg (1913-1991)
- Children: Howard Kestenberg Dr. Janet Kestenberg Amgihi

Judith Ida Kestenberg (née Silberpfennig; 17 March 1910 in Tarnów, Austria-Hungary – 16 January 1999 in Sands Point, New York) was a child psychiatrist. She worked with Holocaust survivors. She founded the International Study of Organized Persecution of Children (ISOPC), which conducted extensive interviews with over 1,500 survivors worldwide. Kestenberg also developed the Kestenberg Movement Profile (KMP), an assessment tool based on movement patterns.

== Early life and education ==
Kesteneberg grew up in a wealthy Jewish industrialist family in Kraków, who moved in 1924 from Poland to Vienna in 1924. She studied medicine at the University of Vienna and specialized in neurology and psychiatry. After receiving her doctorate in 1934 she began training at the Vienna Psychoanalytic Society, and in 1937 undertook a training analysis with Eduard Hitschmann. Concerned with the persecution of the Socialist Party of which she was a member, and interested in continuing her studies, Kestenberg emigrated in 1937 to New York City, where she worked with Paul Ferdinand Schilder at Bellevue Hospital in child psychiatry. For her psychoanalytic training Kestenberg studied at the New York Psychoanalytic Institute and continued with Hermann Nunberg, who had also emigrated to escape the Anschluss. In 1943 she became a member and training analyst at the New York Psychoanalytic Society and Institute.

In 1942, Kestenberg married the lawyer Milton Kestenberg (1913-1991), who had left Poland in 1939. They had two children. She was Professor of Clinical Psychiatry at New York University School of Medicine and also worked at the Long Island Jewish Medical Center. Kestenberg published seven books and over 150 journal articles.

== Kestenberg Movement Profile ==
Kestenberg, like other child psychiatrists, confronted the challenge of analyzing and helping very young children who had limited verbal skills. With her background in neurology, she believed that how a child moved could be a window into the child's ways of feeling and thinking.

Kestenberg began research in the early 1950s with the systematic observation of infants and their movement patterns. Through contact with Maria Ley-Piscator she learned the technique of Laban movement studies as it applied to questions in developmental psychology. She also began a long distance correspondence course with Warren Lamb (a student of Laban) in England to learn more about movement study.

In 1980, Kestenberg invited psychiatrists and movement specialists to join with her in forming the Sands Point Movement Study group. They observed infants in various nurseries and she also spent a summer observing infants and children in a kibbutz in Israel. After many years of work, they developed the Kestenberg Movement Profile, a system of movement observation and analysis used to appraise individuals of all ages including the fetus. The system consists of 63 movement qualities portrayed in two series of diagrams, System I and System II. The System I diagrams focus on the feeling and substance of movement. It includes a profile of temperament, learning styles, use of psychological defenses, cognitive patterns and ways of coping in space weight and time. System II diagrams consist of movements that provide the structure and shape for System I qualities. For example, if someone prefers to focus direct attention when they are studying or interacting with others, an enclosing gesture helps focus that direct attention.

As originally developed, profiles can trace the developmental foundation of movement and make psychological assessments that are psychodynamically informed.

Today, the KMP is still evolving, and has become an assessment and treatment guidance tool in the field of dance movement therapy. It is also a resource for work in family systems and anthropology. It continues to be studied and applied in Germany, South Korea, the UK, Italy, Switzerland, Argentina, the Netherlands, Israel, and the United States.

== Center for Parents and Children ==
In 1976, Kestenberg and her colleague Arnhilt Buelte opened the Center for Parents and Children in Port Washington, New York. (The center later moved to Roslyn, New York.) There, parents and children from birth to four years of age gathered to play and learn in a developmentally informed environment. Parents were able to meet and bond with other parents and children, creating long-lasting communities and friendships. But the principal purpose of the center was primary prevention. Psychiatrists, dance movement therapists and other professionals led the parents and children in play formulated to enhance and reinforce natural developmental patterns. The staff worked with parents to help prevent development disorders and resolve everyday issues. The center was also a place where the Kestenberg Movement Profile was used to help with assessment. Interns worked with the children and made movement profiles of mothers and children to inform work with children and parents. Based on movement understandings, they developed a method of movement retraining in order to support movement development and the interactions between parent and child from infancy.

The original structure and focus of the Kestenberg Movement Profile was based on the metapsychological profile developed by Anna Freud, with its strong emphasis on development. Presently, individual researchers, therapists, anthropologists and movement specialists use the KMP through the lens of their own frameworks.

== Holocaust survivors ==
In the 1970s Kestenberg was treating several patients in her psychoanalytic practice who were child survivors of the Holocaust. She recognized that these individuals were too young to fully remember their experiences, yet were traumatized by them. Many analysts encouraged them to forget, but they were unable to. So Kestenberg undertook a study of conditions of Jewish children during the Holocaust to help individuals recover their memories and combat their traumas. She also developed a system using reimagining kinesthetic sensations, such as of being held, to help adult survivors remember their parents who were murdered during the Holocaust.

She was co-founder of the Hidden Child Foundation as well. Kestenberg's work led to greater recognition of child survivor syndromes and posttraumatic stress disorder. Kestenberg also became involved in working with the children of survivors, investigating the after effects of violent experiences on following generations. She pointed out that this phenomenon also occurs in the situation of children of the perpetrators.

With her husband, Milton, she founded the project International Study of Organized Persecution of Children (ISOPC) in which 1,500 interviews with children survivors were carried out. Among the key collaborators with Kestenberg, was Eva Fogelman and Helene Bass Wichelhaus co-directors of the project.

Kestenberg also wrote several Holocaust related books for children, one of which was expressly for children of perpetrators. It was entitled, "When your grandparents were young." She came to Germany in order to teach German children whose grandparents belonged to the generation of perpetrators of the Holocaust. In her view, the youngest children, had the most urgent need because they were just at the stage of developing a conscience. In the book exclusion and destruction are discussed, the grief of the survivors and the shame of the idler. In the book, the current situation in Germany and the slogan "Foreigners out!" is also addressed. In the epilogue, Kestenberg faces the question of whether young children can be told about the Nazi era, and how it can be done. She argues: "If we really want to prevent war, if we want to avoid the despising of strangers, then we must tell the children the truth - as early as possible."

== Hidden Child Foundation ==
In 1989, Myriam Abramowicz, director and co-producer of As if it Were Yesterday, approached, the Kestenbergs, Fogelman, and Jean Bloch Rosensaft with her vision to organize an international gathering of child survivors who had been hidden during the Holocaust. Hidden children were those who survived the Holocaust by being placed in convents, monasteries, orphanages, non-Jewish homes, or by hiding on their own with or without false identification in forests or in plain sight. Milton and Judith Kestenberg provided the initial funding necessary to plan the First International Gathering of Hidden Children, co-sponsored with the ADL, which happened in 1991. More than 1,600 hidden children and their families attended from all around the world. As a result, the Hidden Child Foundation was established, and local meetings and international conferences continue to this day.

== Awards ==
- "1987 Holocaust Memorial Award" from the New York Society of Clinical Psychologists, Inc, May 14, 1987
- Elise M. Hayman Award for Holocaust Research, International Psychoanalytical Association Congress, Amsterdam, July 28, 1993.
- Eleanor Roosevelt Award, from the American Jewish Congress Commission for Women's Equality, June 14, 1996.

== Bibliography ==
- Kestenberg, Judith S. The Adolescent; Physical Development, Sexuality, and Pregnancy. New York: MSS Information Corp, 1972
- Kestenberg, Judith S., and Esther Robbins. Children and Parents: Psychoanalytic Studies in Development. New York: J. Aronson, 1975.
- Kestenberg, Judith S., and K. Mark Sossin. The Role of Movement Patterns in Development. New York: Dance Notation Bureau Press, 1977
- Kestenberg, Judith S., and K. Mark Sossin. The Role of Movement Patterns in Development 2. 2. New York: Dance Notation Bureau, 1979.
- Kestenberg, Judith. Child Survivors of the Holocaust. New York, N.Y.: Guilford Publications, 1988.
- Kestenberg, Judith S., and Janet Kestenberg Amighi. Kinder zeigen, was sie brauchen: wie Eltern kindliche Signale richtig deuten. Salzburg: Pustet, 1991.
- Kestenberg, Judith S., and Vivienne Koorland. Als Eure Grosseltern jung waren: mit Kindern über den Holocaust sprechen. Hamburg: Krämer, 1993.
- Kestenberg, Judith S., and Eva Fogelman. Children During the Nazi Reign: Psychological Perspective on the Interview Process. Westport, Conn: Praeger, 1994
- Kestenberg, Judith S. Sexuality, Body Movement, and the Rhythms of Development. Northvale, N.J.: J. Aronson, 1995.
- Kestenberg, Judith S., and Ira Brenner. The Last Witness: The Child Survivor of the Holocaust. Washington, DC: American Psychiatric Press, 1996.
- Kestenberg, Judith S., and Charlotte Kahn. Children Surviving Persecution: An International Study of Trauma and Healing. Westport, Conn: Praeger, 1998.
