= Rachel Yehuda =

Professor of psychiatry and neuroscience

- Born: 1959 (age 66–67)
- Education: University of Massachusetts Amherst
- Known for: Research on post-traumatic stress disorder, intergenerational trauma, epigenetics of trauma
- Awards: Member, National Academy of Medicine (2019)
- Scientific career
- Fields: Psychiatry, Neuroscience, Psychology
- Workplaces: Icahn School of Medicine at Mount Sinai; James J. Peters VA Medical Center

Rachel Yehuda (born 1959) is the Chemers Neustein Family Professor of Trauma and Resilience, the Vice Chair of Veterans Affairs in the Department of Psychiatry, and the Director of the Traumatic Stress Studies Division at the Icahn School of Medicine at Mount Sinai. She is also the former Director of Mental Health at the James J. Peters Veterans Affairs Medical Center. In 2020 she became Director of The Parsons Research Center for Psychedelic Healing at Mount Sinai.

== Biography ==
She received her Ph.D. in psychology and neurochemistry and her M.S. in biological psychology from the University of Massachusetts at Amherst and completed her postdoctoral training in biological psychiatry in the psychiatry department at Yale Medical School. In 2019, she was elected to the National Academy of Medicine.

She has authored more than 500 published papers, chapters, and books in the field of traumatic stress and the neurobiology of post-traumatic stress disorder (PTSD). Her interests include the study of risk and resilience factors, psychological and biological predictors of treatment response in PTSD, genetic and epigenetic studies of PTSD and the intergenerational transmission of trauma and PTSD.

She has an active federally funded clinical and research program that welcomes local and international students and clinicians. Her research has focused on PTSD in combat veterans, the children of Holocaust survivors and the children of pregnant women who survived the 9/11 attacks. Her work on diagnostic blood biomarkers for PTSD has yielded a patent approved in the US (9,243,293) and Europe (2334816) for diagnosis and treatment stratification for PTSD.

== Publications ==
=== Author ===
- The Art of Jewish Pastoral Counseling: A Guide for All Faiths with Michelle Friedman, published November 17, 2016, by Routledge
- Yehuda, Rachel (July 1, 2022). "How Parents' Trauma Leaves Biological Traces in Children / Adverse experiences can change future generations through epigenetic pathways". Scientific American. doi:10.1038/scientificamerican0722-50. PMID 39016960. Archived from the original on June 21, 2022.()

=== Contributor ===
- The Psychobiology of Trauma and Resilience Across the Lifespan, published September 5, 2008, by Jason Aronson, Inc.

=== Editor ===
- Psychological Trauma, published August 1, 1998, by American Psychiatric Association Publishing
- Risk Factors for Posttraumatic Stress Disorder, published April 1, 1999, by American Psychiatric Association Publishing
- Psychobiology of Posttraumatic Stress Disorder, published June 16, 2000, by New York Academy of Sciences
- Treating Trauma Survivors with PTSD, published May 2, 2002, by American Psychiatric Association Publishing
- International Handbook of Human Response to Trauma, initially published in 2000, republished November 11, 2013, by Springer US
