= LGBTQ trauma =

Trauma related to LGBTQ Identity

LGBTQ trauma is the distress an individual experiences due to being a lesbian, gay, bisexual, trans, queer person or from possessing another minoritized sexual or gender identity. This distress can be harmful to the individual and predispose them to trauma- and stressor-related disorders.

== Prevalence ==
Academic research implies that sexual and gender minorities are exposed to a heightened number of trauma-related stressors. These traumatic experiences appear to be related to reports from clinicians and epidemiological data from research that LGBTQ+ individuals generally deal with higher levels of interpersonal victimization that have the potential to prove traumatizing. These interpersonal traumas are often experienced by a large portion of sexual and gender minorities. When comparing heterosexual siblings to their same-sex lesbian, gay, or bisexual siblings, it was found that the sexual minority sibling was victimized at a higher rate across each of the types of interpersonal violence. This included partner violence and both childhood and adult physical and sexual assault. Furthermore, it has been found that 54.8% of transgender and gender nonconforming individuals experience childhood abuse compared to 19.5% of cisgender individuals surveyed. One review that looked at the rates of sexual assault amongst sexual minorities found that up to 54% of men that identify as gay or bisexual and up to 85% of women who identify as either a lesbian or bisexual have endured some level of sexual assault.

== Identification ==
Researchers have found essential cultural considerations when attempting to determine whether an LGBTQ+-identified individual has experienced trauma. The method of asking an individual about trauma can decide whether or not they report their experiences accurately. In one study of sexually minoritized men who reported enduring childhood experiences that are typically defined as abusive, only 54% of those men agreed with the statement “I was physically abused." This shows that people will often experience trauma but not mentally recognize it. What was further found was that regardless of whether the men recognized what they experienced was abuse or not, they shared the same rate of mental health problems. This phenomenon implies that the experience of abuse and not the recognition of something being abusive is what leads to poorer mental health outcomes. Considering the above helps inform why it is essential to ask individuals specific questions about experiences they have had or behaviors of those around them when assessing for abusive experiences, instead of relying upon the person's perception or opinion exclusively. This method is critical when working with sexual or gender minority individuals. The shame and stigma around their experience can make them avoid conceptualizing what they went through as abuse.

== Treatment ==
Mental health professionals find it essential to identify trauma responses in their clients because ignoring or overlooking trauma can lead to a misdiagnosis or ineffective treatment approach. Furthermore, some recommend that if the trauma is to the level of the individual having Post-traumatic stress disorder (PTSD) that the PTSD should be prioritized in therapy. The idea is that even if an LGBTQ+-identified individual comes in for concerns related to gender, sexuality, depression, or anxiety that PTSD results in such acute distress that any work on other areas would be ineffective. Furthermore, PTSD can be the source of some of the symptoms the client is experiencing. Thus if they come in for depression and have PTSD, treating the PTSD may solve both problems, whereas only treating the depression may solve neither mental health concern.

Some people fear talking to LGBTQ+ people about their traumatic experiences, often fearing that discussing what someone endured will somehow worsen the trauma. However, people who have been traumatized or have diagnosable PTSD can spend a lot of time thinking about their traumas. Thus, it has been found that many of those individuals find relief when talking about their experiences, particularly in a therapeutic setting with a mental health professional. Multiple studies have shown that it is beneficial when a therapist takes the time to explore a client's prior experiences of domestic violence and other forms of abuse.

One of the ways to explore an individual's traumatic experience is for mental health professionals to ask their client to describe the traumatic event they experienced while including as many details they can recall as possible (i.e., physical sensations, emotions experienced, and thoughts they had at the time). Researchers have found that in doing this, clients feel less shame surrounding the experience and report having more insight into the experience.

== Cultural considerations ==
Due to the high rates of various trauma types, gender, and sexual minority people endure, it is recommended that mental health professionals ask directly about exposure to events that could be considered traumatic and the client's conceptualization of those experiences. The heightened level of discrimination and victimization LGBTQ+ folks experience is theorized to increase a person's susceptibility to trauma responses and exacerbate symptoms compared to the general population. To not influence their responses, therapists are advised to ask broad and open-ended questions to understand better how the client views their experience. Understanding a client's conceptualization of their experience helps the clinician avoid underestimating or overestimating a client's distress related to their sexual and gender minority status. Both making a person's gender or sexuality central to their trauma treatment when it is irrelevant to them or ignoring it when they view it as central to their trauma are considered problematic approaches that invalidate the client's thoughts and experiences.

== Specific responses ==
Some mental health professionals think that the DSM-5's inclusion of reckless or self-destructive behaviors can help provide context for some traits seen in sexual and gender minority populations. Specifically, it may help explain the high rate of sexual risk-taking and substance use amongst LGBTQ+ people. Studies have shown that men with a history of sexual abuse in childhood are more likely to report substance abuse, depression, and engagement in unprotected sex. Research on sexual minority men and trans women has shown a relationship between sexual risk-taking and psychosocial difficulties. The above trends lead some psychologists to endorse what is called a syndemic framework, “whereby co-occurring psychosocial problems common among sexual minority and transgender and gender nonconforming individuals produce an adverse synergistic effect on health.

== See also ==
- LGBTQ health
- Suicide among LGBTQ people
