= Race and health in the United States =

Research shows many health disparities among different racial and ethnic groups in the United States. Different outcomes in mental and physical health exist between all U.S. Census-recognized racial groups, but these differences stem from different historical and current factors, including genetics, socioeconomic factors, and racism. Research has demonstrated that numerous health care professionals show implicit bias in the way that they treat patients. Certain diseases have a higher prevalence among specific racial groups, and life expectancy also varies across groups.

Research has consistently shown significant health disparities among racial and ethnic groups in the U.S.; not rooted in genetics but in historical and from ongoing systematic inequities. Structural racism that has been embedded in employment, education, healthcare, and housing has led to unequal health outcomes, such as higher rates of chronic illnesses among Black, and Indigenous populations. An implied bias in healthcare also contributes to inequality in diagnosis, treatment, and overall care. Furthermore, the historical injustices including "medical exploration" during slavery and segregation have sown further mistrust and inequity that persists today. Efforts to reduce these differences include culturally competent care, diverse healthcare work-forces, and systematic policy corrections specifically targeted at addressing these disparities.

== Background ==
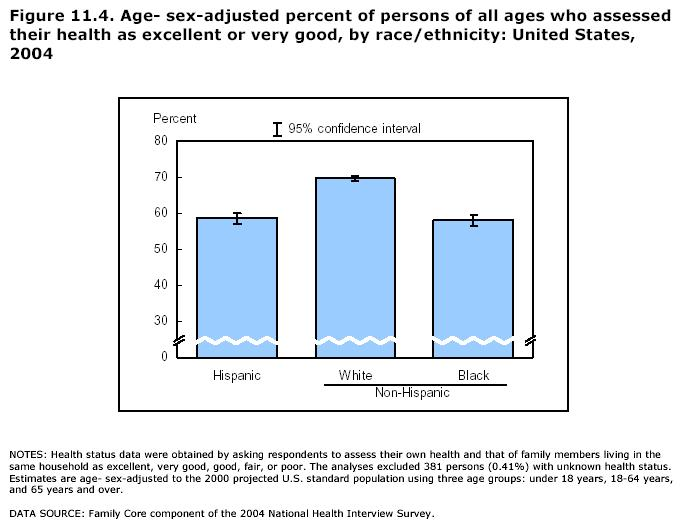
Health ratings by race in the United States

The U.S. Census definition of race is often applied in biomedical research in the United States. According to the Census Bureau in 2018, race refers to one's self-identification with a certain racial group. The Bureau also specifies that its use of "race" is as a social concept, not a biological or anthropological one. The Census Bureau recognizes five races: Black or African American, White (European American), Asian, Native Hawaiian or other Pacific Islander, and American Indian or Alaska Native. Despite the fact that the United States continues to become more diverse, these Census categories have not changed for almost 20 years. The Census Bureau also recognizes differences in ethnicity among the population, and it defines ethnicity as whether a person is of Hispanic origin or not. For this reason, ethnicity is broken out into two categories in its data, Hispanic or Latino and Not Hispanic or Latino. Hispanics may report as any race. These categories are used across most federal health surveys and statistical systems, which is why emerging patterns in mortality, chronic illnesses and diseases, and access to care in the U.S. are reported along the same racial and ethnic lines.

The 2010 U.S. census further specifies the number of Americans who identified with each racial and ethnic group; in 2010, 38.9 million identified as African American, 14.6 million as Asian American, 2.9 million as American Indian or Alaskan Native and 50.4 million as Hispanic or Latino. These numbers are used in national reports, such as CDC's Health, United States and AHRQ's National Healthcare Quality and Disparities Reports, to calculate rates and compare different results across multiple groups over time.

Measures of the relationship between race and medicine are imperfect and inconsistent. The 2000 U.S. Census definition is inconsistently applied across the range of studies that address race as a medical factor, making it more difficult to assess racial categorization in medicine. Additionally, the socially constructed nature of race makes it so that the different health outcomes experienced by different racial groups can be connected to social factors rather than inherent biological ones. A 2023 scoping review of the literature found that in studies conducted in multiracial or multiethnic populations, the inclusion of race or ethnicity variables lacked thoughtful conceptualization and informative analysis regarding race or ethnicity as indicators of exposure to racialized social disadvantage. This highlights the need for the more thoughtful and theoretically sound rationale for the inclusion of race or ethnicity variables in health research, aligning with the understanding of race as a social construct and acknowledging its role as a marker of exposure to racialized social disadvantage. Recent consensus reports have also alerted against using race as a fixed biological marker in clinical systems (e.g., kidney function "race corrections"), instead suggesting that researchers specify the true social or environmental exposure they want to measure. Public health agencies have stated that breaking down date by specific origin (e.g., separating Native Hawaiian from other Pacific Islanders, or Mexican origin from other Hispanic subgroups) can show hidden disparities that general Census categories tend to miss.

There are significant disparities in health outcomes between the five racial groups recognized by the U.S. Census. These health disparities are in part caused by different levels of income across the five groups recognized by the U.S. Census. Although the level of income plays a key role in health disparities outcomes, other factors tie into this as well, such as bias and racism which cause notable differences in access to healthcare and the quality of healthcare received by those of minority groups.

Non-white racial groups may experience bias and racism within the medical system, impacting these groups' access to and quality of care. Additionally, the racism experienced in daily life affects health outcomes. The stress associated with racism can negatively impact a person's physical and mental health and has been shown to contribute to health problems such as depression, anxiety, insomnia, heart disease, skin rashes, and gastrointestinal problems. Discriminatory stresses can also cause issues like blood pressure inconsistencies, and low-birth weight problems for women. This repetitive "weathering" effect, described in U.S. public health literature explains why some Black women experience markers of physiologic aging and higher risk of adverse birth outcomes at earlier ages when compared to White women in similar socioeconomic status. National Academic reviews and peer-reviewed studies have linked repeated exposure to discrimination with higher levels of allostatic load, emotional dysregulation which stems from hypothalamic-pituitary-adrenal axis, and finally with higher risk of cardiometabolic disease. As a scientifically studied topic in medicine, racism's Medical Subject Headings code for the United States National Library of Medicine's MEDLARS/MEDLINE, PubMed and PubMed Central bibliographic and open access medical journal databases is D063505.

== Life expectancy ==
The twentieth century witnessed a great expansion of the upper bounds of the human life span. At the beginning of the century, average life expectancy in the United States was 47 years. By the century's end, the average life expectancy had risen to over 70 years, and it was not unusual for Americans to exceed 80 years of age. However, although longevity in the U.S. population has increased substantially, race disparities in longevity have been persistent. African American life expectancy at birth is persistently five to seven years lower than European Americans. By 2018 that difference had shrunk to 3.6 years.

As of 2020, Hispanics had a life expectancy at birth of 78.8 years, followed by non-Hispanic Whites at 77.6 years and non-Hispanic blacks at 71.8 Years. In 2021, life expectancy for Native Americans was 65 years. For black Americans, 71; for white Americans, 76; for Hispanic Americans, 78; and 84 for Asian Americans.

A study by Jack M. Guralnik, Kenneth C. Land, Dan Blazer, Gerda G. Fillenbaum, and Laurence G. Branch found that education had a substantially stronger relation to total life expectancy and active life expectancy than did race. While 65-year-old black men had a lower total life expectancy (11.4 years) and active life expectancy (10 years) than white men (total life expectancy, 12.6 years; active life expectancy, 11.2 years), those differences were reduced when controlling for education. The same was not true for females: at 65 years old, black and white women had similar life expectancies to white women. And at ages 75 and 85, both black men and black women had significantly longer life expectancies than their white peers, with the black advantage being even greater when matching for education.

During the 20th century, the difference in life expectancy between black and white men in the United States did not decline.

Throughout the 20th century, life expense expectancy in the US rose. in 1900 the average life expectancy at birth was 47 years old. By the end of the century, it had increased to over 70 and many individuals consistently lived into their 80s. However while overall lifespan improved, the difference, differences in life expectancy between racial and ethnic groups have persisted at a plateau.

Historically, African-Americans have experience more life expectancy than white Americans. And the early 2000s the gap between black and white population was around 5 to 7 years but by 2018 the gap had narrowed to 3.6 years data from 2021 show the following life expectancy estimate: 65 years for Native Americans, 71 years for non-Hispanic black Americans, 76 years for non-Hispanic white Americans, 78 years for Hispanic Americans, and 84 years for Asian Americans.

This clear view of these disparities are shaped by various social structural factors, including differences in access to healthcare, exposure to chronic stressors, social economic status, and community level conditions, such as environmental quality and neighborhood safety. Structural racism has also been identified as a significant influence for the differences in life expectancy and overall health outcomes.

Research has shown that education is a very powerful predictor of life expectancy. And one study when adjusting for education, the life expectancy gap between black and white men narrowed significantly. At 65 the difference is in both total active life expectancy between black and white men were reduced one education levels were held constant. This trend was less consistent among women or life. Expectancy differences by race were smaller overall

Despite some progress, the reduction in the life expectancy gap has not been the same. For example, during the 20th century, the life expectancy difference between black and white men show little long-term decline. More recent events, such as COVID-19 has revealed more vulnerabilities among racial and ethnic minority groups, contributing to temporary declines in the life expectancy in some populations.

Life expectancy by race in each state in 2018
State	All Races	White	Hispanic	Black	Asian	American Indian and Alaska Native
United States	78.7	78.6	82.0	75.0	86.3	77.4
Alabama	75.4	76.0	79.1	72.9	80.2	78.7
Alaska	78.8	80.0	80.9	79.0	87.1	70.5
Arizona	79.9	80.0	81.0	76.8	87.0	71.8
Arkansas	75.9	76.0	79.2	72.8	80.6	78.4
California	81.6	80.7	83.6	76.0	87.6	75.7
Colorado	80.5	80.6	81.0	77.2	87.9	74.2
Connecticut	80.9	80.6	82.9	78.0	87.2	83.6
Delaware	78.4	78.5	81.3	75.2	85.7	83.1
District of Columbia	78.6	87.5	87.8	72.6	89.5	98.5
Florida	80.0	79.9	82.1	76.1	86.1	81.6
(Georgia (U.S. state)) Georgia	77.8	78.0	81.3	75.5	85.2	80.8
Hawaii	82.3	81.3	87.9	80.9	83.7	81.9
Idaho	79.3	79.1	83.1	81.3	84.9	74.6
Illinois	79.3	79.1	82.9	73.9	85.3	83.0
Indiana	77.0	76.8	82.0	73.2	85.1	81.2
Iowa	79.4	79.3	81.8	74.8	86.6	80.1
Kansas	78.5	78.2	81.5	73.8	84.2	79.1
Kentucky	75.4	75.5	79.6	72.9	80.2	78.9
Louisiana	76.1	77.1	80.9	73.1	81.1	80.5
Maine	78.7	78.6	82.1	80.9	85.9	83.8
Maryland	79.1	80.0	81.9	75.3	87.3	83.7
Massachusetts	80.5	80.2	82.1	78.8	86.1	84.1
Michigan	78.0	78.0	80.9	73.5	86.0	79.8
Minnesota	80.9	81.0	83.4	79.3	86.8	69.9
Mississippi	74.9	76.0	79.3	72.6	80.8	79.2
Missouri	77.3	77.5	81.9	73.6	84.6	81.0
Montana	78.8	79.3	82.1	81.9	86.1	69.5
Nebraska	79.6	79.6	82.1	73.9	86.3	71.1
Nevada	78.5	76.8	80.7	76.3	84.1	74.9
New Hampshire	79.5	79.3	83.5	80.8	87.6	84.4
New Jersey	80.4	80.2	82.7	74.8	87.2	84.1
New Mexico	78.1	78.7	78.6	74.8	81.8	73.9
New York	81.3	81.0	82.4	78.0	87.4	83.7
North Carolina	78.0	78.5	81.8	75.0	84.3	76.8
North Dakota	79.9	80.1	85.1	82.1	88.3	69.7
Ohio	76.9	77.1	81.1	73.0	85.9	80.6
Oklahoma	76.0	76.1	80.9	72.9	81.0	73.6
Oregon	79.8	79.5	84.0	77.5	86.4	76.9
Pennsylvania	78.3	78.3	82.2	73.2	86.9	82.2
Rhode Island	79.9	79.7	83.9	73.6	86.4	84.0
South Carolina	77.0	78.0	81.4	73.6	83.1	80.9
South Dakota	79.1	80.0	82.7	81.2	85.2	67.8
Tennessee	76.0	76.1	80.7	72.7	82.6	80.4
Texas	79.1	78.5	81.3	74.2	85.1	81.8
Utah	79.9	79.6	81.9	80.2	84.3	74.3
Vermont	79.7	79.6	83.1	81.1	87.2	85.0
Virginia	79.5	79.7	84.7	74.5	86.0	82.3
Washington	80.4	80.1	81.7	78.0	84.3	74.0
West Virginia	74.8	74.8	79.7	72.2	79.8	79.0
Wisconsin	79.4	79.4	83.3	73.4	85.8	71.7
Wyoming	79.0	79.0	81.8	80.2	85.2	72.9

=== Socioeconomic factors ===
While socioeconomic status (SES) is a contributing factor in race health disparities, it does not account for all the variation. Even when controlling for socioeconomic status, racial divides in health persist. For example, Black Americans with college degrees have worse health outcomes than White and Hispanic Americans who have high school diplomas. Studies on heart disease mortality have found that gaps between Black and White Americans exist at every education level. A longitudinal study over more than twenty years found that Black physicians had higher prevalence of cardiovascular disease, earlier onset of disease, twice the incidence of hypertension, and higher prevalence of diabetes compared to White physicians. For maternal mortality, Black women who are college graduates have pregnancy-related mortality ratios (number of pregnancy-related deaths for every 100,000 live births) that are 1.6 times greater than White women who had not finished high school. Black women have higher maternity mortality rates than white women regardless of socioeconomic status and pre-existing health conditions. Stereotypically, research shows that job candidates with African American names like "Keisha or Jerimiah" are less likely to receive follow ups after their interviews as opposed to other applicants who have white names like "Emily or Sophie" despite having similar resumes. This form of discrimination and bias prevents minority groups from gaining access to skilled jobs or careers further affecting SES.

According to the American Journal of Preventive Medicine, a data analysis was performed using The Behavioral Risk Factor System survey to examining the perceptions of racial privilege in healthcare among different races. These results showed that whites with a higher income and an educational background had an increase perception in receiving medical treatment and a decrease in discrimination. Oppose to blacks the perceptions were the complete opposite compared to whites. Several studies suggest that race is a positive association with socioeconomic status and education when providing health services. Currently, there are future research being conducted to understand the concept behind racial privileges in the healthcare.

Social economic status (which includes income, education, and occupational status) is a well established determine of health outcomes in the US. However, research consistently shows that SES alone does not fully explain racial and ethnic disparities in health. For instance, health gaps persist between racial groups even when income and education levels are similar. Black Americans with college degrees for example often report poor health outcomes than white Americans with only a high school education.

Evidence also indicates that racial disparities in chronic disease prevalence and mortality rates exist across all educational levels. Studies of heart, disease, morality rates, show that black individuals experience, worse outcomes than white individuals, regardless of their education. A long-term study examining cardiovascular health on that black physicians had a higher prevalence of cardiovascular disease, hypertension, and diabetes, compared to white physicians, despite comparable professional status.

In the area of maternal health, similar disparities exist. Black women with college degrees face higher pregnancy related mortality rates than white women without high school diplomas these pattern suggests that factors beyond SES, which is including stress related to structural racism and differential treatment within healthcare settings, making contribute to these outcomes.

In addition to healthcare, racial bias, and employment may also indirectly affect health by limiting access to stable income and employer based health benefits. Studies have found that applicants with names perceived as African-Americans are less likely to receive interview callbacks, compared to those with white sounding names, even when resumes are otherwise identical. This type of bias can reduce opportunities for economic advancement, which contributes to the disparities in SES it's health related impacts.

Perceived experiences of discrimination within healthcare also very by race. According to a few national surveys, why individuals with higher education and income, tend to report, fewer instances of discrimination and have a greater confidence in receiving appropriate medical treatment. But in contrast, black individuals, even those with higher SES are more likely to report experiencing racial bias or unequal treatment in healthcare environments.

These patterns reflect the con the very complex ways in which race in social economic status interact to influence health. While SES is a powerful determine, it does not remove the effects of racism or structural and inequality in healthcare access and quality. Ongoing research is exploring how these interesting factors shape health equity and inform interventions to address both economic and racial disparities and health.

== Specific diseases ==
Health disparities are well documented in minority populations such as African Americans, Native Americans, and Latinos. In the year 1985, a report, known as the Heckler Report, was released to address the state of concern regarding African American and minority populations. This report sought to look at statistical data that showed its prevalence and the action towards bridging this health equity gap. The report identified six areas of health concern: cancer, cardiovascular disease and stroke, chemical dependency related to cirrhosis of the liver, diabetes, homicides and accidents, and infant mortality. When compared to European Americans and Asian Americans, these minority groups have higher incidence of chronic diseases, higher mortality, and poorer health outcomes. More importantly noted are the number of lives that could have been saved if healthcare were the same between both populations. That is, African Americans and minority populations having access to healthcare that meets their needs and seek to address this much needed change.

Minorities often have higher rates of cardiovascular disease, HIV/AIDS, and infant mortality than whites. U.S. ethnic groups can exhibit substantial average differences in disease incidence, disease severity, disease progression, and response to treatment.

- African Americans have higher rates of mortality than does any other racial or ethnic group for 8 of the top 10 causes of death. The cancer incidence rate among African Americans is 10% higher than among European Americans and the mortality rate from asthma is twice the rate of European Americans.
- African Americans are found to have some of the highest rates of chronic Hepatitis C and Hepatitis C-related deaths in comparison to other populations.
- U.S. Latinos have higher rates of death from diabetes, liver disease, asthma, and infectious diseases than do non-Latinos.
- In 2015, nearly 2.2 million Hispanics/Latinos nationwide reported having asthma, with Puerto Rican Americans possessing almost tripled the asthma rate of the overall Hispanic population. A part of this disparity can be said to be due to the higher rates of pollution found in communities of people of color.
- Adult African Americans and Latinos have approximately twice the risk as European Americans of developing diabetes.
- Asian Americans are 60% more likely to being at risk of developing diabetes in comparison to European Americans and are more likely to develop the disease at lower BMIs and lower body weights. South Asians are especially more likely to developing diabetes as it is estimated South Asians are four times more likely to developing the disease in comparison to European Americans.
- Native Americans usually suffer from higher rates of diabetes, tuberculosis, pneumonia, influenza, and alcoholism than does the rest of the U.S. population. Disparities in diabetes and cardiovascular disease have been hypothesized to be linked to higher rates of suboptimal sleep in this population.
- European Americans die more often from heart disease and cancer than do Native Americans, Asian Americans, or Hispanics.
- White Americans have far higher incident rates of melanoma of the skin or skin cancer than any other race/ethnicity in the US. In 2007 incident rates among white American males were approximately 25/100,000 people, whereas the next highest group (Hispanics and natives) has an incidence rate of approximately 5/100,000 people.
- Asian Americans are at higher risk for hepatitis B, liver cancer, tuberculosis, and lung cancer. The subgroup of Filipino Americans suffer health risks similar to that of African Americans and European Americans combined.
- According to the NIH, African Americans are more likely to develop diabetes. Usually, type 2 diabetes is more prominent in middle-aged adults. Being obese or having a family history can also affect this. Over the past 30 years in the US, "black adults are nearly twice as likely as white adults to develop type 2 diabetes." Besides this difference just being between black and white adults, we see the greatest margin of comparison between black and white women.
- In 2015, 87 percent of all TB cases in the United States occurred in those that are identified as racial and ethnic minorities, especially Hispanics, Asians, and African Americans. Even more recently, African Americans are considered the group with the highest rate of infection, totaling more than 1,000 cases in 2019. Socioeconomic factors are the related cause, alongside it presenting barriers to treatment in the disease.
- Sickle cell disease is more susceptible to be found in those of descent from places such as those in the Mediterranean, Italy, Turkey, and Greece, as well as Africa and regions of South and Central America. The disease affects how oxygen is delivered to the red blood cells and is often diagnosed at a young age, discovered through a diagnosis of anemia.
- In a 2019 study on racial discrimination and dental health in the U.S. the authors found that the "emotional impact of racial discrimination" results in fewer visits to a dentist.
- According to the National Health and Nutrition Examination Survey data, childhood obesity is more common among Hispanic (25.8%) and Black children (22.0%) compared to white children (14.1%). In other studies the same results are seen in adults from the same race and ethnicity.
- A 2021 systematic review on hearing loss in adults found an absence of racial and ethnic diversity in studies that did not represent the diversity of the US population.
- The likelihood of developing kidney, liver, stomach, and cervical cancers among Native Americans is two to three times higher than among white people.

== African Americans ==
=== History ===
Disparities in health and lifespan among blacks and whites in the US have long existed. Many African Americans and minorities weren't subjects of outreach, nor attended to for medical conditions. Several incidents throughout early history show maltreatment, neglect, and being denied healthcare in comparison to the white population. Foregoing early treatment progresses infection, leads to disability, or ultimately death, dependent upon the disease. One of those events was the flu epidemic of 1918. Black communities were either refused care, received subpar attention, or, where available, expected and pursued aid from black nurses. Although current information reflects that minorities in the United States have lower life expectancies and encounter a larger number of health conditions than their white counterparts, the health of black people has not always been documented. Accurate numbers show the number of African Americans infected, disabled, or died—or succumbed to it—aren't available; records remain scarce, since so few of those victims were able to get to institutional healthcare providers or agencies. David R. Williams and Chiquita Collins wrote that, although racial taxonomies are socially constructed and arbitrary, race is still one of the major bases of division in American life. Throughout U.S. history racial disparities in health has been pervasive. In a 2001 paper, Williams and Collins also argued that, although it is no longer being legally enforced, racial segregation is still one of the primary causes of racial disparities in health because it determines socioeconomic status by limiting access to education and employment opportunities. Clayton and Byrd write that there have been two periods of health reform specifically addressing the correction of race-based health disparities. The first period (1865–1872) was linked to Freedmen's Bureau legislation and the second (1965–1975) was a part of the Civil Rights Movement. Both had dramatic and positive effects on black health status and outcome, but were discontinued. Even though African-American health status and outcome is slowly improving, black health has generally stagnated or deteriorated compared to whites since 1980.

The Tuskegee study was another example of health disparities among African Americans. The study showed lack of medical treatment and discrimination among blacks. African Americans find it difficult to participant in clinical trials due to lack of understanding and knowledge received by researchers.

In 1932, the Tuskegee study involved 600 black men, 399 with syphilis and 201 with no disease. Researchers told the men that they were being treated for "bad blood," a term used in the study to describe several ailments, including syphilis, anemia, and fatigue. The men were told by researchers and health professionals that they would be participating in a study to cure their current illnesses. The men in the study later found they were not being treated for the purpose they agreed upon. This study resulted in a class action lawsuit due to lack of evidence, no consent, misleading information, and medical neglect. As a result of lack of treatment, by July 1972 when the study ended, over 100 participants had died, 40 spouses had been diagnosed, and disease had been passed to 19 children at birth.

In one study, researchers found that medical professionals perceive black patients to be less susceptible to pain than their white patients. White patients are given better treatment and access than black patients. As a result, black patients are more vulnerable to disease than white counterparts.

Sickle cell is a blood disease that is very prevalent in the African American community. This disease cannot be seen with the naked eye. Because of this illness's invisibility, African American patients can be suffering and most likely to be ignored by healthcare providers. Sickle cell was not discovered in the west until 1910. Although sickle cell is not the only invisible disease, it is an example of an invisible illness and how it affects some African Americans. There are many other diseases and illnesses that cannot be seen visibly, causing people to get discriminated against, not only because of their illness but also because of how they look.

Demographic changes can have broad effects on the health of ethnic groups. Cities in the United States have undergone major social transitions during the 1970s, 1980s, and 1990s. Notable factors in these shifts have been sustained rates of black poverty and intensified racial segregation, often as a result of redlining. Indications of the effect of these social forces on black-white differentials in health status have begun to surface in the research literature.

Race has played a decisive role in shaping systems of medical care in the United States. The divided health system persists, in spite of federal efforts to end segregation, health care remains widely segregated both exacerbating and distorting racial disparities. Furthermore, the risks for many diseases are elevated for socially, economically, and politically disadvantaged groups in the United States, suggesting to some that environmental factors and not genetics are the causes of most of the differences.

There was a trend in health discrimination throughout the COVID-19 pandemic. Data has shown that African Americans have higher rates of contracting COVID-19 as well as dying from it. These rates are mainly high in majority black communities; oftentimes because these communities are more population dense and have higher rates of individuals living with no health insurance, low socioeconomic status, and chronic diseases. Structural racism has forced a majority of African Americans to live in low SES communities and has limited their ability to thrive due to less resources. Because of these lack of resources many African Americans were unable to sustain things like social isolation, transportation, and food.

=== Racism ===
Racial differences in health often persist even at equivalent socioeconomic levels. Individual and institutional discrimination, along with the stigma of inferiority, can adversely affect health. Racism can also directly affect health in multiple ways. Residence in poor neighborhoods, racial bias in medical care, the stress of experiences of discrimination and the acceptance of the societal stigma of inferiority can have deleterious consequences for health. Racism is a key determinant of socioeconomic status (SES) in the United States, and SES, in turn, is a fundamental cause of racial inequities in health. Using The Schedule of Racist Events (SRE), an 18-item self-report inventory that assesses the frequency of racist discrimination. Hope Landrine and Elizabeth A. Klonoff found that racist discrimination was frequent in the lives of African Americans and is strongly correlated to psychiatric symptoms.

A study on racist events in the lives of African American women found that lifetime racism was positively correlated to lifetime history of both physical disease and frequency of recent common colds. These relationships were largely unaccounted for by other variables. Demographic variables such as income and education were not related to experiences of racism. The results suggest that racism can be detrimental to African Americans' well-being. The physiological stress caused by racism has been documented in studies by Claude Steele, Joshua Aronson, and Steven Spencer on what they term "stereotype threat."

Kennedy et al. found that both measures of collective disrespect were strongly correlated with black mortality (r = 0.53 to 0.56), as well as with white mortality (r = 0.48 to 0.54). A 1 percent increase in the prevalence of those who believed that blacks lacked innate ability was associated with an increase in age-adjusted black mortality rate of 359.8 per 100,000 (95% confidence interval: 187.5 to 532.1 deaths per 100,000). These data suggest that racism, measured as an ecologic characteristic, is associated with higher mortality in both blacks and whites.

Two local governments in the US have issued declarations stating that racism constitutes a public health emergency: the Milwaukee County, Wisconsin executive in May 2019, and the Cleveland City Council, in June 2020.

Princeton Survey Research Associates found that in 1999 most whites were unaware that race and ethnicity may affect the quality and ease of access to health care.

=== Inequalities in health care ===
Inequalities and inequities within healthcare often arise as a result of social determinants of health. These determinants influence health disparities, including the quality of care received. Race and ethnicity play a significant role in access to health services, and treatment within the healthcare system can sometimes lead to worse health outcomes. Health care inequality's and inequities are shaped by obstacles such as poverty, discrimination, and lack of access. In 2021, California reported that one in ten Latino's had no health insurance, and more than 25% reported being in poor health. According to the California Health Interview Survey (CHIS) in 2022, one in four black participants reported believing they would have received better care if they were of a different race or ethnicity. The Oklahoma Department of Public Health released an improvement plan in 2020 emphasizing the role of social determinants of health in contributing to racial health disparities.

There is a great deal of research into inequalities in health care. In 2003, the Institute of Medicine released a report showing that race and ethnicity were significantly associated with the quality of healthcare received, even after controlling for socioeconomic factors such as access to care. In some cases these inequalities are a result of income and a lack of health insurance, a barrier to receiving services. Almost two-thirds (62 percent) of Hispanic adults aged 19 to 64 (15 million people) were uninsured at some point during the past year, a rate more than triple that of working-age white adults (20 percent). One-third of working-age black adults (more than 6 million people) were also uninsured or experienced a gap in coverage during the year. Blacks had the most problems with medical debt, with 31 percent of black adults aged 18 to 64 reporting Past-Due Medical Debt, vs. 23 percent of whites and 24 percent of Hispanics.

Compared with white women, black women are twice as likely and Hispanic women are nearly three times as likely to be uninsured. However, a survey conducted in 2009, which examined whether patient race influences physician's prescribing, found that racial differences in outpatient prescribing patterns for hypertension, hypercholesterolemia, and diabetes are likely attributable to factors other than prescribing decisions based on patient race. Medications were recommended at comparable rates for hypercholesterolemia, hypertension and diabetes between Whites and African Americans.

It has been argued that other cases of inequalities in health care reflect a systemic bias in the way medical procedures and treatments are prescribed for different ethnic groups. Raj Bhopal writes that the history of racism in science and medicine shows that people and institutions behave according to the ethos of their times and warns of dangers to avoid in the future. Nancy Krieger contended that much modern research supported the assumptions needed to justify racism. Racism contributes to unexplained inequities in health care, including treatment for heart disease, renal failure, bladder cancer, and pneumonia. Raj Bhopal writes that these inequalities have been documented in numerous studies. The consistent and repeated findings that black Americans receive less health care than white Americans—particularly where this involves expensive new technology—is an indictment of American health care.

The infant mortality rate for African Americans is approximately twice the rate for European Americans, but, in a study that looked at members of these two groups who belonged to the military and received care through the same medical system, their infant mortality rates were essentially equivalent. Recently a study was conducted by the KFF, the Henry J Kaiser Family Foundation, in order to learn more about the infant mortality rate throughout the United States. All fifty states were surveyed. Different distributions of racial categories used in the study includes, "Non-Hispanic White, Non-Hispanic Black, American Indian or Alaska Native, Asian or Pacific Islander, or Hispanic". The infant mortality rate was compiled by the number of infant deaths per one thousand live births. In 2015, on an average nationwide, the United States reported that for Non-Hispanic white had an infant mortality rate of NSD meaning there as not enough sufficient data, Non-Hispanic black's rate was 11.3, Indian or Alaska Native's was 8.3, Pacific Islander was 4.2, and the infant mortality rate on average for Hispanic was 5.0.

Recent immigrants to the United States from Mexico have better indicators on some measures of health than do Mexican Americans who are more assimilated into American culture. The number of Native Americans diagnosed increased by 29% just between the years of 1990 and 1997. The prevalence of this among women and men shows that women more often have diabetes than men, especially in communities of Native American people.

A report from Wisconsin's Department of Health and Family Services showed that while black women are more likely to die from breast cancer, white women are more likely to be diagnosed with breast cancer. Even after diagnosis, black women are less likely to get treatment compared to white women. University of Wisconsin African-American studies Professor Michael Thornton said the report's results show racism still exists today. "There's a lot of research that suggests that who gets taken seriously in hospitals and doctors' offices is related to race and gender," Thornton said. "It's related to the fact that many black women are less likely to be taken seriously compared to the white women when they go in for certain illnesses."

Krieger writes that given growing appreciation of how race is a social, not biological, construct, some epidemiologists are proposing that studies omit data on "race" and instead collect better socioeconomic data. Krieger writes that this suggestion ignores a growing body of evidence on how noneconomic as well as economic aspects of racial discrimination are embodied and harm health across the lifecourse. Gilbert C. Gee's study A Multilevel Analysis of the Relationship Between Institutional and Individual Racial Discrimination and Health Status found that individual (self-perceived) and institutional (segregation and redlining) racial discrimination is associated with poor health status among members of an ethnic group.

In the 2020 covid pandemic, a disproportionate rate in the amount of covid deaths in the African American communities compared to other racial groups has been demonstrated in some part of the United States. Many cases such as covid and AIDs has led more African Americans to lose trust in healthcare intuitions and the government that is supposed to protect their rights. Milwaukee County is just one of many examples of such communities that were hit hard by covid. African American represented three fourths of covid deaths. This has been a common factor for many parts of the countries major populated cities that have has high percentage of African Americans.

To address these health disparities, physician Dr. Greg Hall of Ohio founded the National Institute for African American Health (NIAAH) and launched a multivitamin for African-Americans, GNetX Sequence. Further, he authored Patient-Centered Clinical Care for African Americans: A Concise, Evidence-Based Guide to Important Differences and Better Outcomes (2020) which is the first book to broadly address best practices in the clinical care of African Americans.

=== Race-Based Diagnoses ===
Racial groups, especially minority groups, are frequently exposed to different types of barriers when in need of medical treatment. The World Health Organization identifies some of these barriers, including unequal access to health services, lack of cultural sensitivity, differing quality of services, timeliness of access to such services, and general discrimination in healthcare systems. Certain racial groups can receive different courses of treatment, diagnoses, and prescription medications than those that self-identify as other races. These differences can be commonly linked to correction factors in medical calculators, algorithms that are unable to account for variables rooted in social disparities, and drugs designed for specific racial populations. BiDil is a drug used to treat congestive heart failure in black people. The Food and Drug Administration initially rejected applications of the medication since their clinical trials did not demonstrate any efficacy for a general racial population within the United States, except for African Americans. BiDil's manufacturer, NitroMed, then completed a clinical trial that solely enrolled African Americans. They found a decrease in mortality for this exclusive group and in 2005, the FDA approved the drug's usage exclusively for black patients. It is currently still in use with the same stipulation.

BiDil has been considered to be a "race drug" by some in the medical community. Backlash stems from a debate on whether race can be a reliable factor in making diagnoses and prescriptions. Those that oppose its usage believe its prescription process to be unscientific. With respect to BiDil's racialization, Sheldon Krimsky wrote, "'self-identified race' is a subjective term, influenced by cultural factors, and not even grounded in the ancestral genomics."

Ziad Obermeyer M.D., et al. found that a specific algorithm, which determines what patients need further care, favors additional medical attention towards white people over black people. This analysis was based on data concerning average health costs that are incurred by these specific races. The same article puts forward the claim, "Bias occurs because the algorithm uses health costs as a proxy for health needs," as African Americans have been found to face disproportionate poverty levels in the United States and are forced to spend less on healthcare than white patients. This bias caused the algorithm to find that black patients are generally healthier than white patients and a conclusion was created by the algorithm that black patients do not need extra care in such instances.

Estimated glomerular filtration rate (eGFR) is a scored measurement of a patient's kidney function. Once measured, healthcare providers can utilize the test score to determine the quality of kidneys' filtering ability in a given patient. According to a study by Dr. Darshali Vyas, et al., the equation for eGFR reports a higher score for black patients by a factor of 1.210, which the study's authors doubt the validity of. The algorithm's developers backed the results, citing that black people have higher creatinine levels, which can be a lurking variable in eGFR calculations. Vyas makes a rebuttal to this idea, stating, "Explanations that have been given for this finding include the notion that black people release more creatinine into their blood at baseline, in part because they are reportedly more muscular." In reality, this generalization may not be the case and can be harmful to minorities that encounter such correction factors. New equations for estimating kidney function using creatinine and cystatin C were published in 2021. These are race-blind and recommended to be used by labs by the National Kidney Foundation and the American Society of Nephrology. This race based equation can lead to patients being overestimated kidney function by up to 16% in Black patients. This may cause a delay in diagnosis of kidney failure and referral to transplant.From July 27th 2022, the Organ Procurement and Transplantation Network requires kidney recipients to be waitlisted using race neutral eGFR. From January 2023 transplant programs will need to compensate for the extra waiting time gained by affected Black candidates. As of mid march 2024, over 14,300 Black candidates have had their waiting time changed. On average this was an extra 2 years. Over 2,800 candidates have been given transplants.

Similarly, the vaginal birth after Caesarean section (VBAC) medical calculator is used to estimate the probability that a patient will successfully complete a vaginal birth if they have already had a birth via Caesarean section. There are correction factors based on race that have been commonly used in this calculator; self-reported African American patients' results are multiplied by a factor of 0.671. The VBAC calculator is in the process of being altered by the Maternal-Fetal Medicine Units Network, as of December 2021, to omit race and ethnicity in the interest of ignoring such "socially constructed variables" that may be inaccurate.

=== Mental health ===
Stress can be derived from many individualistic factors or experiences, has multiple effects on health. Stress is also associated with chronic diseases. Stress that is derived from racism has specific contextual factors, which adds a daily burden to African-Americans and other demographic groups that are discriminated against. These demographic groups do not often realize that these stressors may be contributing to the state of their mental health. Groups of people are also affected in ways that may not be outward acts of racism by another person, but through education, economics, the justice system, and largely through law enforcement. It is also possible that people who hold racist ideals have mental health problems as well, such as self-centeredness, inability to empathize, and paranoia over groups of people they are discriminating against. Individuals can develop complexes about ethnic groups and races, automatically displaying emotions without learning about the people themselves, and will cut off all friendliness to them.

There are many barriers that exist in the relationship for African Americans accessing mental health services. These barriers can range from family dynamics, institutional racism, socioeconomic status, and a host of other reasons. This is particularly true for African Americans in need of mental health services who could benefit from effective treatment. "Effective treatment exists for many mental disorders, an indicator of need for mental health services (MHS), receive any treatment. This underutilization is more pronounced among African Americans than Non Hispanic whites (Villatoro & Aneshensel, 2014). There is something to be said about the lack of utilization of mental health services amongst African Americans. There are several possible explanations for the state of mental health use in African American communities. While many African Americans do not receive mental health services, those who do receive services are negatively impacted by the institutional bias that exists between them and non-black counselors. In a study of 47 clinicians and 129 African Americans who sought therapy, researchers found that African Americans tend to have a healthy cultural paranoia about their non-black therapists. Interviews with them found Black patients simultaneously engaged in and scanned the encounter for feelings of comfort; safety in disclosing personal information; being trustful of the provider; and being listened to, understood, and respected by the provider. For some patients, judgments about the initial encounter seem to have less to do with clinical expertise or experience of the provider and more with perceptions of empathy and the quality of the interpersonal connection between the two individuals (Earl, Alegría, Mendieta, & Diaz Linhart, 2011). In order to improve the outcomes of therapy for African Americans, it is imperative that non-black therapists are culturally competent. Increasing cultural competence of mental health clinicians will help foster an empathetic relationship between clinicians and their clients.

In addition, the social environment in which African Americans live in plays a role in their mental health. Ecological approaches that aim to systematically modify how the world interacts with blackness, life experiences that African Americans perceive as stressful, depression, and perceived racial discrimination may have the greatest impact on mental health in African Americans and may lead to additional improvements in the holistic well-being of African Americans.

African American millennial's mental health has also raised concerns due to the lack of being able to find employment. African American males between the age of twenty and twenty-four were studied and were found to experience unemployment at almost double the rate of their white peers. Mental issues are presented in the form of addictions such alcohol and smoking. Conditions of depression have reported as well. Societal pressure of gender norm is one factor that leads to mental health issues for African American males.

=== Maternal and child health ===
Tamara speaks about feeling "ignored" as a Black mother in the United States in 2019.

African American women are three to four times more likely to die in childbirth than white women, while their babies are twice as likely to die than white babies, even when controlled for many factors such as education, income, and health. Danyelle Solomon argues that "White racism" is the highest cause of unrest in communities, pushing them further apart, and causing more black women and infants to die because of it. Racism affects several components of a black woman's life in regards to being able to give birth or currently carrying. Racism found in the delivery of health care and social service means black women often receive substandard care in comparison to white women. As well, denial of care to black women that seek help when enduring pain, or that health care and social service providers fail to treat them with dignity and respect when it comes to their wellbeing. African American women face greater chances than white women to have chronic stress which can stem from living in impoverished neighborhoods or encountering discrimination. These embedded stressors as a result of societal inequities and prejudice could largely explain the underlying health disparities in negative birth outcomes. Although studies examining the effects of prenatal stress are limited, for a few reasons, evidence does support the consequences of high levels of stress or anxiety. Women are said to bear low birth weight or preterm infants from elevated stress or anxiety, and even more so with a lack of social support. In the aftermath, newborns become predisposed to issues, such poor physical development, from the mother's stress during pregnancy. With that being said, stress from racism not only affects mental and physical wellbeing, but disproportionately place black infants at a disadvantage for future attainment.

Black women in the United States are three to four times more likely to die during childbirth and two to three times more likely to experience severe pregnancy-related illnesses, than white women. Research shows that these disparities persist regardless of education level or socioeconomic status; for example, a Black women with a college degree remains at higher risk of pregnancy complications than a White woman without a high school diploma. Scholars and health experts cite the United States' history of racism and discrimination as major factors influencing maternal health disparities. Maternal health advocates support the expansion of Medicaid benefits, as 65% of Black mothers in the U.S. rely on Medicaid for coverage. Recent studies indicate that policies restricting reproductive health care, such as those following the Supreme Court's Dobbs v. Jackson Women's Health Organization decision, are likely to worsen maternal mortality overall, with disproportionate effects on Black Women .

Racism in education has decreased significantly over the past century, however this does not help increase the income for black people, and increased incomes do not provide better health opportunities, especially for mothers and infants. Higher education and income levels for black mothers does not affect this mortality rate. There are also higher chances that a complication will occur during birth. Solomon argues that the 'toxin' of these rates is racism, which has created a toxic environment for minority groups to live in with multiple stressors that effect health.

In 2012, a study was conducted on early pregnancy women which followed their children from birth to 5 years old to determine the risk factors of obesity among low-income black children. However, the study showed that children of overweight and obese mothers are more than likely to become obese or overweight by the age of 5. According to the U.S. Department of Health and Human Services Office of Minority, African American women have the highest rates of obesity or being overweight compared to any other groups in the United States.

=== Cardiovascular disease ===
Research has explored the effect of encounters with racism or discrimination on physiological activity. Most of the research has focused on traits that cause exaggerated responses, such as neuroticism, strong racial identification, or hostility. Several studies suggest that higher blood pressure levels are associated with a tendency not to remember or report racist and discriminatory incidents. Personal experiences of racist behaviors increase stress and blood pressure.

Although the relationship racism and health is unclear and findings have been inconsistent, three likely mechanisms for cardiovascular damage have been identified:

- Institutional racism leads to limited opportunities for socioeconomic mobility, differential access to goods and resources, and poor living conditions.
- Personal experiences of racism acts as a stressor and can induce psychophysiological reactions that negatively affect cardiovascular health.
- Negative self-evaluations and accepting negative cultural stereotypes as true (internalized racism) can harm cardiovascular health.

According to the U.S. Department of Health and Human Services Office of Minority Health, in 2018, African Americans were 30% more likely to die from heart disease than non-Hispanic whites.

=== Alzheimer's disease ===
Alzheimer's disease (AD) is a progressive, irreversible neurodegenerative disease and it is the leading cause of dementia. African Americans are disproportionately affected by Alzheimer's, with higher prevalence and incidence in African Americans than the overall average. Genetics are a huge risk factor for Alzheimer's, but known high-risk genes for the disease have different effect sizes in African Americans compared to other racial groups.

Many of the risk factors for Alzheimer's such as high blood pressure and diabetes are more prevalent in African American communities. Therefore, making Alzheimer's disproportionately impact black communities within America. The Alzheimer's Impact Movement is an association that seeks to advance the care for those who have Alzheimer's and Dementia. The Washington Heights-Inwood Columbia Aging Project in 2020 collected data on the percentages of people aged 65 or older with Alzheimer's disease or other types of Dementia. For each demographic ages 65–74, 75-84, and 85+, the proportion of African Americans with Alzheimer's were two times larger than the proportion of white individuals within those age groups. Although African Americans are more likely to develop Alzheimer's, they are only 34% more likely to receive a diagnoses for their condition. If diagnosed, it's typical for the disease to have already developed into the later stages with further deteriorated cognition. As a result, African Americans tend to pay substantially more for health services. For African Americans in 2014 it was discovered that the average per-person Medicare payment was 35% higher than white individuals with Alzheimer's. Another study set on by The Chicago health and Aging project in 2018 found that the higher risk of Alzheimer's disease could stem from disparities within educational attainment. Findings from the study portray a contradiction between cognition decline and cognition and Dementia risk. The findings could reflect upon lacking cognitive reserves developed over their lifespan. Exposure to racism, access to resources, and exposures to neurotoxins have consequentially leading to poorer cognitive function and disproportionately develop Dementia.

=== Fear of racism ===
It has been argued that while actual racism continues to harm health, fear of racism, due to historical precedents, can cause minority populations to avoid seeking medical help. For example, a 2003 study found that a large percentage of respondents perceived discrimination targeted at African American women in the area of reproductive health. Likewise beliefs such as "The government is trying to limit the Black population by encouraging the use of condoms" have also been studied as possible explanations for the different attitudes of whites and blacks towards efforts to prevent the spread of HIV/AIDS.

Infamous examples of real racism in the past, such as the Tuskegee Syphilis Study (1932–1972), have injured the level of trust in the Black community towards public health efforts. The Tuskegee study deliberately left Black men diagnosed with syphilis untreated for 40 years. It was the longest nontherapeutic experiment on human beings in medical history. The AIDS epidemic has exposed the Tuskegee study as a historical marker for the legitimate discontent of Black people with the public health system. The false belief that AIDS is a form of genocide is rooted in recent experiences of real racism. These theories range from the belief that the government promotes drug abuse in Black communities to the belief that HIV is a manmade weapon of racial warfare. Researchers in public health hope that open and honest conversations about racism in the past can help rebuild trust and improve the health of people in these communities. In 2001 the Journal of the National Medical Association has concluded that this fear causes those within the African American community to avoid clinical trials. Although these trials are now set up to protect participants, black communities remain wary. This also has its downsides, as it's impossible to know if drugs will impact white and colored persons the same without these trials. Past medical malpractice has led to distrust, which in turn makes creating necessary medicine for the black community more difficult. Perpetuating the lack of resources and health care available to black communities. The experimentation and abuse set onto black bodies in the pursuit of medical development has a long and treacherous history. The Tuskegee experiment is one of the more well known experiment, where black men with Syphilis were left untreated to ease the doctors' curiosities concerning the natural course of the disease when left untreated. Many of the men were told that their study was concerning "bad blood" and nothing more. The doctors would dissuade these individuals from seeking outside help, while performing blood draws, spinal taps, and autopsies. The Tuskegee experiments have had generational consequences in the belief of health care. There are many in the black community who believe the government injected syphilis virus into those men in the experiment. Although this has not been factually proven, rumors within the community were enough to create long withstanding distrust. The same goes for agreeing to being an organ donor on a drivers license. Many African Americans will immediately say no, as there's a belief that their organs will be misused.

Many of the violent and inhuman actions taken towards people of color have shaped how African Americans within the U.S view health care. The Mississippi Appendectomy is where many black slaves were used as test subjects to treat vesicovaginal fistulas, an experiment performed by Dr. James Marion Sims. Dr. Sims was heralded as a brilliant physician, despite his inhumane experimentation on black women to further his career. Experiments such as these transformed after the 15th Amendment, where many white citizens were afraid of black populations gaining too much power. The forceful sterilization of black women without their knowledge is one of the many examples of white Americans attempting to regulate and control populations within black communities. Although injustice like this has become illegal in recent years, the fear it has created remains, resulting in the distrust of health care professionals and birth control methods. Many woman have not received justice for the things done to them. Medical research has historically been a form of violence for black communities living within the United States.

In 2001 the Journal of the National Medical Association has concluded that this fear causes those within the African American community to avoid clinical trials. Although these trials are now set up to protect participants, black communities remain wary. This also has its downsides, as it's impossible to know if drugs will impact white and colored persons the same without these trials. Past medical malpractice has led to distrust, which in turn makes creating necessary medicine for the black community more difficult. Perpetuating the lack of resources and health care available to black communities. The experimentation and abuse set onto black bodies in the pursuit of medical development has a long and treacherous history. The Tuskegee experiment is one of the more well known experiment, where black men with Syphilis were left untreated to ease the doctors' curiosities concerning the natural course of the disease when left untreated. Many of the men were told that their study was concerning "bad blood" and nothing more. The doctors would dissuade these individuals from seeking outside help, while performing blood draws, spinal taps, and autopsies. The Tuskegee experiments have had generational consequences in the belief of health care. There are many in the black community who believe the government injected syphilis virus into those men in the experiment. Although this has not been factually proven, rumors within the community were enough to create long withstanding distrust. The same goes for agreeing to being an organ donor on a drivers license. Many African Americans will immediately say no, as there's a belief that their organs will be misused.

Hospitals have long been spaces that have made black persons within the United States feel unwelcomed. Hospitals that were available to black communities have a history of being underfunded and racially discriminatory environments. A study performed in early 2022 by Lown Institute identified hospitals which still used segregation practices that would underserve patients from colored communities. Meanwhile, some of the more inclusive hospitals gain less revenue than these hospitals with exclusionist practices. Many of these hospitals receive lower payments for patient care. This could be the direct result of the present wealth imbalances between races within the United States. Research done by the Journal of General Internal Medicine has determined that persevering funding disparities have led to less quality resources for hospitals that predominantly serve black patients.

Studies by the Health and Human Rights journal in 2020 have determined widening health disparities in the wake of COVID-19. Testing kits were initially provided equally among the labs within the U.S., however, there was a lack of consideration of population density within those communities. It was determined that many African Americans lacked access to these tests. Within Kansas, out of roughly 94,780 tests, only 4,854 were used by African Americans, while 50,070 were used by white individuals. African Americans within the state made up roughly one third of all COVID-19 related deaths, demonstrating how Black communities were disproportionately impacted. The predisposal of low wage jobs to communities of color impact the ability to access necessary health resources. Black communities' fear and distrust within health professionals has led to underlying health issues becoming untreated. When a person with these health issues comes into contact with COVID-19, it becomes a much more lethal situation.

=== Environmental racism ===
Environmental racism is the intentional or unintentional targeting of minority communities for the siting of polluting industries such as toxic waste disposal, through the race-based differential enforcement of environmental rules and regulations and exclusion of people of color from public and private boards and regulatory bodies, resulting in greater exposure of the community to pollution. RD Bullard writes that a growing body of evidence reveals that people of color and low-income persons have borne greater environmental and health risks than the society at large in their neighbourhoods, workplaces and playgrounds.

Environmental racism stems from the environmental movement of the 1960s and 1970s, which focused on environmental reform and wildlife preservation and protection, and was led primarily by the middle class. The early environmental movement largely ignored the plight of poor people and people of color who, even in the mid-20th century, were increasingly exposed to environmental hazards.

Policies related to redlining and urban decay can also act as a form of environmental racism, and in turn, affect public health. Urban minority communities may face environmental racism in the form of parks that are smaller, less accessible and of poorer quality than those in more affluent or white areas in some cities. This may have an indirect effect on health since young people have fewer places to play and adults have fewer opportunities for exercise.

Although impoverished or underdeveloped communities are at greater risk of contracting illnesses from public areas and disposal sites, they are also less likely to be located near a distinguished hospital or treatment center. Hospitals relocate to wealthier areas where the majority of patients are privately insured, thus reducing the number of low-income patients. Whereas hospitals were previously established in the areas with the greatest need, most are now focused on economic gain from private insurance companies, and are threatened by Medicare funding cuts.

Robert Wallace writes that the pattern of the AIDS outbreak during the 80s was affected by the outcomes of a program of 'planned shrinkage' directed in African-American and Hispanic communities, and implemented through systematic denial of municipal services, particularly fire extinguishment resources, essential for maintaining urban levels of population density and ensuring community stability. Institutionalized racism affects general health care as well as the quality of AIDS health intervention and services in minority communities. The overrepresentation of minorities in various disease categories, including AIDS, is partially related to environmental racism. The national response to the AIDS epidemic in minority communities was slow during the 1980s and '90s showing an insensitivity to ethnic diversity in prevention efforts and AIDS health services.

=== Institutionalized racism ===
A major downfall of the U.S. healthcare system is the unconscious racial biases held by many white American doctors, often resulting in decreased quality of care for African American patients. One such example is the discrepancy in cardiovascular surgical procedures between white and black patients. Compared to their white counterparts, black patients are less likely to receive necessary coronary bypass surgeries and lipid-lowering medications upon discharge from the hospital. This means that black patients leave treatment centers with a significantly different health outcome. African American patients are also less likely to receive a referral for Cardiac rehabilitation following a cardiac event and/or surgery. As a result, this potentially exacerbates other issues, creates development of ancillary conditions, disability, or even death from a lack of care due to subliminal racism. It is actions like these from White doctors that contribute to the higher incidence of non-communicable disease, such as heart disease, in the black community and shorter life expectancy. Some White health care providers also maintain problematic, overt ideas about their Black patients, with being seen as less intelligent, less able to abide by treatment regimens, and more inclined to be subjects of risky behavior than their White counterparts. Institutionalized racism exhibits itself both in material conditions and in access to power. Whether through differential delivery and access to a quality education, appropriate housing, necessary employment, or any others that are regarded as the basics or necessities in life, reflect material conditions. An education is foundational to being able to achieve and attain for a better standards of living and longevity in life. However, with inequity in an education comes being place at a disadvantage, which doesn't level the playing ground for equal attainment. In the case of the black community, not only is the population discriminated against on the basis of race, but socioeconomic status, which gives rise to even greater inequality. In the aspect of access to power, examples include differential access to information (including one's own history), resources and expressing concerns or rights as equal members of the public.

One potential cause of this discrepancy in treatment is the systematic racism present in the medical field that targets the work of African American scientists. Research shows that doctors and scientists of color are significantly underfunded in the medical community, and are less likely than their white colleagues to win research awards from the National Institute of Health. Since patients of color are often treated by white doctors, miscommunication is common; research shows that many Americans feel their doctors do not listen to their questions or concerns, or are too uncomfortable to ask certain medical questions.

To help build trust in the health care system amongst the African American community one step would be the need to address the lack of African American doctors. Studies have shown that African Americans make up thirteen percent of the United States population and only represent four percent of doctors in the country. One example is the lack of "Black" OGBYN. Many African American women have stated that their preference for a black doctor is derived from adverse issues coming from childbirth, and Black women are three times more likely to die from complications of childbirth than white women. This is only one example among many where the lack of representation is hurting a community that makes up a high percentage of the United States healthcare cases.

=== Segregation ===
Some researchers suggest that racial segregation may lead to disparities in health and mortality. Thomas LaVeis (1989; 1993) tested the hypothesis that segregation would aid in explaining race differences in infant mortality rates across cities. Analyzing 176 large and midsized cities, LaVeist found support for the hypothesis. Since LaVeist's studies, segregation has received increased attention as a determinant of race disparities in mortality. Studies have shown that mortality rates for male and female African Americans are lower in areas with lower levels of residential segregation. Mortality for male and female European Americans was not associated in either direction with residential segregation.

In a study by Sharon A. Jackson, Roger T. Anderson, Norman J. Johnson and Paul D. Sorlie the researchers found that, after adjustment for family income, mortality risk increased with increasing minority residential segregation among Blacks aged 25 to 44 years and non-Blacks aged 45 to 64 years. In most age/race/gender groups, the highest and lowest mortality risks occurred in the highest and lowest categories of residential segregation, respectively. These results suggest that minority residential segregation may influence mortality risk and underscore the traditional emphasis on the social underpinnings of disease and death.

Rates of heart disease among African Americans are associated with the segregation patterns in the neighborhoods where they live (Fang et al. 1998). Stephanie A. Bond Huie writes that neighborhoods affect health and mortality outcomes primarily in an indirect fashion through environmental factors such as smoking, diet, exercise, stress, and access to health insurance and medical providers. Moreover, segregation strongly influences premature mortality in the US.

A 2024 study found that residential segregation resulted in negative birth outcomes for non-Hispanic Black infant populations in the area, while no comparable effects were detected for non-Hispanic White infant populations.

=== Racism towards doctors and health care professionals ===
Many healthcare professionals have experienced hate and racist remarks towards them at work. At hospitals, walk-in clinics, and family doctor's offices, professionals are hit with bias-based comments concerning "general bias, ethnicity / national origin, race, age, gender, accent, religion, political views, weight, medical education from outside the US, sexual orientation, and more". This study conducted features the races of "African American/Black, Asian, Caucasian, and Hispanic" There is little training for doctors to handle this type of prejudice at their work. The even greater downfall are men and women who face bigotry from unruly, demeaning, and complicated patients that disrupt delivery of care. Doctors and healthcare professionals could feel years of education could have been unworthy of such circumstances, unappreciated, and uninspired for continued service. Although all healthcare professionals could be at risk for discrimination from patients, some populations experience it a greater rate. While there is a need to increase the number of doctors and other critical healthcare professionals, thoughts of dealing with racism or other prejudice can be discouraging.

The group that experiences racism most are black healthcare professionals, such as doctors and nurses that provide care to the general public. Like much of the views held by white doctors regarding black patients, reflect the same perspectives of white patients regarding black doctors. A patient's refusal of care based on their perception of the attending physician's race or background can raise thorny ethic, legal, and clinical issues. In addition, black faculty members have encountered a lack of mentorship and sponsorship, barriers to promotion and advancement, lack of support, and hostile work environments as factors leading to attrition from academic medical centers. Experiencing discrimination is associated with several negatives including career outcomes and an unwelcoming work environment. Professionals can often feel alone and reluctant to be accepting of racism as a part of the profession. A greater initiative from healthcare organizations surrounding policy that protects not only black doctors, but also other professionals who deliver care, would retain much-needed diversity and leadership in medicine.

=== Homicide ===
Homicide plays a significant role in the racial gap in life expectancy. In 2008, homicide accounted for 19% of the gap among black men, though it did not play a significant role in the decline in the gap from 2003 to 2008. A report from the U.S. Department of Justice states "In 2005, homicide victimization rates for blacks were 6 times higher than the rates for whites." Research by Robert J. Sampson indicates that the high degree of residential segregation in African American neighborhoods is responsible for the high homicide rate among African Americans.

=== Trends ===
Based on data for 1945 to 1999, forecasts for relative black: white age-adjusted, all-cause mortality and white: black life expectancy at birth showed trends toward increasing disparities. From 1980 to 1998, average numbers of excess deaths per day among American blacks relative to whites increased by 20%. David Williams writes that higher disease rates for blacks (or African Americans) compared to whites are pervasive and persistent over time, with the racial gap in mortality widening in recent years for multiple causes of death. Junk food advertisements target African Americans.

== Latinos and Hispanics ==
=== History ===
While Latino and Hispanic populations are not considered a race category by the U.S. Census, this section of the article refers to Latinos or Hispanics as an ethnic group, as classified by the Census Bureau. Hispanic usually refers to the language and individuals whose ancestry comes from a Spanish-speaking country. Latino usually refers to geography, specifically to Latin America, including Mexico, the Caribbean, Central America and South America. References to the Latino and Hispanic community in the United States are frequently linked to discussions about immigration. The geographic origins of Hispanic and Latino influxes of immigration have changed through the years. During the 2010s Latin American and Caribbean countries have accounted for the main source of immigrant populations migrating towards the United States.

The Hispanic Paradox is an important aspect of discussions around the history of the health of Latino and Hispanic populations in the United States. In 1986, Prof. Kyriakos Markides conceived the term "the Hispanic paradox" to refer to the epidemiological phenomenon that Hispanic individuals in the US live longer than their white non-Hispanic counterparts despite the general lower socioeconomic status of the population and their relative lack of access to healthcare. The US Centers for Disease Control and Prevention published a report on May 5, 2015, relating to the general status and causes of deaths of Hispanic population in the United States. The report utilized mortality indicators and national health surveillance of Hispanic populations compared to their White counterparts to explore the possibility of Markides' paradox. Primarily results indicated that Hispanic deaths from diabetes, liver disease, and homicide were substantially higher than in non-Hispanic white populations. Nevertheless, Hispanics generally had a 24% lower risk of all-cause mortality and lower risks of nine of the leading 15 causes of death in the USA (most notably, cancer and heart disease).

Tied to the health status of Latinos and Hispanic in the United States is an observed mistrust of doctors and the health system. This mistrust can stem from language barriers, threat of discrimination and historical events that dismissed the consent of patients like the sterilization of Latina women in California until 1979. According to a study conducted by the United States Census Bureau, Hispanics were the population that was most likely to have never visited a medical provider, with 42.3 percent reporting that they had never done so. The U.S healthcare system is largely geared toward serving English speakers which creates an issue for Latino and Hispanic individuals that don't speak English. Five(55%) of the nine studies examining access to acre found a significant adverse effect of language; three (33%) found mixed or weak evidence that language affected access. Six (86%) of the seven studies evaluating quality of care found a significant detrimental effect of language barriers.

=== Mental health ===
In many Hispanic and Latino communities, mental health problems are viewed as a sign of weakness and are not necessarily validated. Hispanics/Latino are often cited as a high-risk groups for mental health issues, particularly for substance abuse, depression, and anxiety. A study conducted from 2008 to 2011, sampled more than 16,000 Hispanics/Latinos ages 18 to 74 in four diverse communities in the states of New York, Chicago, San Diego, and Miami. The findings demonstrated that 27 percent of Hispanics/Latinos in the study reported high levels of depressive symptoms.

U.S population is made up of 17.8% Hispanic and Latino individuals. Out of those individuals, 15% had a diagnosable mental illness. This means 8.9 million people who are Latino or Hispanic suffered from a mental illness. Immigrants in this community face inequalities in socioeconomic status, education, and access to health care services. Hispanics are one of the lowest races/ethnicities to receive treatment based on research from 2013.

Research have signaled multiple sources of stress that could potentially impact mental health outcomes in Hispanic/Latino communities. For example, language influences the way patients are evaluated. Several studies have found that bilingual patients are evaluated differently when interviewed in English as opposed to Spanish and that Hispanics are more frequently under-treated. Furthermore, Hispanics/Latinos are more likely to report poor communication with their health provider. Income has also proven to be a significant factor that impacts the mental health of Latino communities, as low-income individuals may have limited access to mental health services. Nationally, 21.1% of Hispanics are uninsured compared to 7.5% non-Hispanic individuals. Low insurance coverage affects this group of people because ethnicity plays a role, immigration status, and citizenship status. Only 1 in 10 Hispanics with a mental disorder utilizes mental health services from a general health care provider. Moreover, only 1 in 20 Hispanic individuals receives such services from a mental health specialist.

=== Maternal and child health ===
According to the Census Bureau, while the number of non-Hispanic white women of childbearing age (15–44 years) is projected to decrease from 36.5 million in 2010 to 35.2 million in 2020, the number of Hispanic women of childbearing age is projected to increase from 11.8 million in 2010 to more than 13.8 million Hispanic women. The increase in the Hispanic population in the United States is driven in part by high fertility rates. During 2012, the fertility rate for Hispanic identifying women was 74.4 births per 1,000 women of ages 15–44. In 2012, Hispanic women accounted for 23 percent or 907,677 of all of the 3,952,841 live births in the United States. Within the Hispanic population, the majority of births occurred among those of Mexican descent (61.2%), followed by Central/South American (14.5%), Puerto Rican (7.4%), and Cuban (1.9%).

There is high medical disparity amongst hospitals contributing to high mortality rates based on resources compared to non-Hispanic and white mothers. Examining the data from 2010, the infant mortality rate (death during the first year of life) among Hispanic women was 5.3 per 1,000 live births. This rate accounted for more than 20 percent of all infant deaths in the United States during the year 2010. According to the National Center for Health Statistics, "when specific causes of infant mortality are examined the leading cause of infant deaths in 2010 among Hispanics was birth defects (136.5 per 100,000 live births), followed by prematurity/low birth-weight (85.0 per 100,000 live births), maternal complications of pregnancy. Hispanic mothers were 70 percent as likely to receive late or no prenatal care as compared to non-Hispanic white mothers, in 2017. Research suggests that improving quality of the lowest-performing hospitals could benefit both non-Hispanic white and Hispanic women while reducing ethnic disparities in serve maternal morbidity rates.

=== Access to healthcare ===
Hispanic health is often shaped by factors such as language/cultural barriers, lack of access to preventive care, the lack of health insurance, illegal immigration status, mistrust, and illiteracy. The Centers for Disease Control and Prevention has cited some of the leading causes of illness and death among Hispanics, which include heart disease, cancer, unintentional injuries (accidents), stroke, and diabetes. Latino and Hispanic communities have a hard time communicating with health professionals due to a language or cultural barrier; as a result, they turn to outside sources for help and medication. The survey finds that half of those who have faced these barriers turned to a family member or to another health care provider for assistance. Many hospitals and offices lack trained interpreters and rely on ad hoc interpretation by bilingual staff or even the children of patients. Latino and Hispanic communities have concerns when it comes to long care services in the United States. Some have concerns about finding nursing homes and assisted-living facilities that will respect their religious or spiritual beliefs, though fewer have the same concern about home health aides. The lack of education creates another barrier for individuals in these communities that are bilingual but can't understand medical terms. According to a 2017 U.S. Census Bureau report, 68.7 percent of Hispanics in comparison to 92.9 percent non-Hispanic whites had a high school diploma. More than one-fourth of Hispanic adults in the United States lack a usual health care provider, and a similar proportion report obtaining no health care information from medical personnel in the past year. Latino adults receive information from an alternative source, such as television and radio, based on a PHC survey. Not only are most Latinos obtaining information from media sources, but a sizeable proportion (79 percent) say they are acting on this information. Many Latinos are accustomed to self-treating because most pharmaceuticals are available without prescription in their home countries. Immigrants may face additional obstacles to care, including illegal immigration status (fears of deportation), illiteracy, and a radically different set of health beliefs.

== Native Americans and Alaska Natives ==
=== History ===
American Indian and Alaska Native populations in the United States have experienced disproportionately negative health outcomes compared to non-Hispanic whites since colonists arrived at the continent in the 15th century, particularly due to epidemics introduced by colonial groups and violent encounters with colonists. A disparity in health outcomes between American Indians and Alaska Natives and the general U.S. population persists today, largely due to a lack of access to adequate medical care, language barriers, and decreased quality of medical services in regions with significant American Indian and Alaska Native populations. One of the elements of the inequality involves the lack of research that begins to look into access to medical care for Native Americans, and when research does exist, it tends to be broad and not focus on specific elements, including childhood. As of October 2019, American Indian and Alaska Native people who are born today have a life expectancy of 73 years, compared to the 78.5 years for the general American population.

The Indian Health Service (IHS) is a federal agency committed to serving the health needs of American Indian and Alaska Native populations. Two pieces of legislation, the Snyder Act of 1921 and Indian Health Care Improvement Act of 1976, obligated the United States government to provide healthcare to federally recognized Native American tribes. In 1955, this responsibility moved to the IHS, housed under the U.S. Department of Health and Human Services. In 2019, the IHS served over 2.3 million American Indians and Alaska Natives from 573 different federally-recognized tribes.

Since its implementation, the IHS has been criticized for its treatment of patients. Most notably, throughout the 1960s and 1970s, the IHS forcibly sterilized thousands of American Indian and Alaska Native women. A 2000 study found that between 1973 and 1976, physicians at four IHS facilities – those in Albuquerque, Oklahoma City, Phoenix, and Aberdeen, South Dakota – sterilized 3,406 women, 3,001 of whom were of childbearing age at the time.

The federal government has been criticized for the lack of funding granted to the IHS. Expenditures per capita for IHS have been substantially lower than those for other federally funded healthcare programs. Studies have found that physicians employed by the IHS express a need for increased funding for the agency, to adequately meet the healthcare needs of American Indians and Alaska Natives in the United States.

Because the IHS serves only federally-recognized tribes, not all people in the United States that identify with this racial group have access to IHS resources. The American Indian and Alaska Native population includes, but is not limited to, those who are affiliated with federally recognized tribes – there are also state-recognized tribes and unrecognized tribes, and individuals who do not live on tribal lands but identify as Native American. Thus, while IHS plays a role in the health outcomes of American Indian and Alaska Native identifying people in the United States, it is not the sole determinant of health outcomes for this census group.

=== Mental health ===
American Indian and Alaska Native identifying people are more likely to have unmet mental health needs, and to experience major depressive episodes than the non-Hispanic white population. In 2016, 6.7% of American Indian and Alaska Native adults reported having needs for mental health services that had been unmet in the last twelve months, compared to 5.4% of the non-Hispanic white population. 8.3% of American Indian and Alaska Native adults reported experiencing a major depressive episode in the past twelve months, whereas only 7.4% non-Hispanic white adults did so.

American Indian and Alaska Native adolescents are more likely to have experienced a major depressive episode in their lifetime, with 16.7% of adolescents in 2016 reporting such an episode compared to 14.4 of non-Hispanic white adolescents. The 2014 White House Report on Native Youth noted that Native Americans between the ages of 15 and 24 years were 2.5 times more likely to commit suicide than the national average. Rates of post-traumatic stress disorder (PTSD) are also higher for American Indians and Alaska Natives than the general United States population.

Historical trauma is also an issue faced by Native Americans. Dr. Maria Yellow Horse Brave Heart first described historical trauma for Native Americans in the 1980s as, "cumulative emotional and psychological wounding", which in turn affects both physical and mental health. The traumatic events she references include imprisonment and genocide, among other causes. She outlines the six steps of the historical trauma as follows: 1) First Contact (including the grieving period and following colonization period), 2) Economic Competition, 3) Invasion (causing more death and grieving), 4) Reservation Period, 5) Boarding School Period (focusing on the destruction of cultural aspects, including family structure and language), and 6) Forced Relocation.

Some critics of current mental health practices have argued that mental health professionals working with American Indian and Alaska Native communities should adjust their practices to patients' cultures, particularly by increasing attention to spirituality. There have also been efforts to increase understanding of how the symptoms of DSM-recognized disorders may differ in indigenous communities as a result of different cultural practices.

In 2016, American Indian and Alaska Native youth were slightly less likely than non-Hispanic white youth to receive specialty mental health services. They were significantly more likely to receive non-specialty mental health services such as counseling from social workers, school counselors, and pediatricians.

Alcoholism in American Indian and Alaska Native populations has often been studied, although the rates found depend on both the statistics used and how the statistics are divided. One study from 1995 found that 26.5% of deaths for American Indian and Alaska Native men were alcohol-related, while about 13.2% were for women. Another study from 1996 found that in 1993, 34% of adolescents (grades 7–12) reported they had ever been drunk. Historically, the perceived rates of alcoholism in Native Americans led to the stereotype that they are genetically more prone to alcoholism. This stereotype has been called into question, with modern researchers instead focusing on how historical trauma and PTSD are correlated with alcoholism.

=== Maternal and child health ===
In 2016, maternal mortality rates were 4.5 times higher for American Indian and Alaska Native women than for non-Hispanic white women. Between 2008 and 2012, 5.3% of American Indian and Alaska Native women giving birth were diagnosed with gestational diabetes, compared to 3.7% of non-Hispanic white women.

American Indian and Alaska Native women are less likely to receive prenatal care than non-Hispanic white women in the United States. In 2016, 60.4% of American Indian and Alaska Native women received prenatal care in their first trimester, compared to 81.6% of non-Hispanic white women. American Indian and Alaska Native women are significantly more likely to not begin receiving prenatal care until their third trimester – 9.3% of American Indian and Alaska Native women, compared to 2.9% of non-Hispanic white women. Whereas 0.8% of non-Hispanic white women do not receive any prenatal care throughout their pregnancy, 2.3% of American Indian and Alaska Native women go entirely without prenatal care.

The infant mortality rate for American Indian and Alaska Native populations exceeds that of non-Hispanic white identifying people in the United States. In 2016, American Indians and Alaska Natives had an infant mortality rate of 8.4 per 1,000 live births, compared to 4.1 per 1,000 non-Hispanic white live births. 15.2% of infants born to American Indian and Alaska Native women are born prematurely, compared to 10.7% of infants born to non-Hispanic white women.

=== Environmental Racism ===
Native American tribes in 2012 occupied 95 million acres of various ecosystems across the United States. Climate change affects the wildlife and resources that many tribes rely on, and activities such as fracking threaten their access to clean water. Alaskan Native Americans use surrounding resources for approximately 80% of their diets and have faced coastal flooding as a result of climate change, so they are an especially vulnerable group. The tribes will sometimes be willing to stay on the same land they have occupied for many years, even if the environment becomes threatening, which leads to health problems such as consuming contaminated water.

One of the most recent examples of environmental effects on American Indian and Alaska Native people is the Keystone XL Pipeline affair, which involves a 1,200-mile pipeline crossing through the territory of the Fort Belknap Indian Community of Montana and the Rosebud Sioux Tribe of South Dakota. President Barack Obama halted construction in 2015 following protests citing fears of water contamination and the lack of research on the impact for Native communities, but President Donald Trump approved construction shortly upon entering office. In 2018, Native groups put forward a lawsuit against the 2017 permit citing a failure to respect historically established borders and to conduct a risk assessment. In October 2019, over 380,000 gallons of crude oil were spilled by the Keystone Pipeline in North Dakota, affecting nearby wetlands.

== Asian Americans ==
=== History ===
Asian Americans have been a prominent group in the United States for the past 200 years. According to the U.S. Census Bureau, there were estimated to be more than 22 million Asian Americans in the United States as of 2018. The five most prominent subgroups amongst Asian Americans are: Chinese Americans, Indian Americans, Filipino Americans, Vietnamese Americans and Korean Americans.

Asian immigration in large numbers began in the 19th century with significant populations of Chinese Americans, Korean Americans and Japanese Americans entering the United States. However, in the 20th century, other groups such as Indian Americans began to immigrate in larger numbers due to more specialized jobs available in the United States.

Asian Americans have often been subject to racism like other minority groups within the United States. This can be seen in events like the Japanese Internment camps like Camp Manzanar that were built during World War II for Japanese Americans to live in and were subject to inhumane treatment.

As Asian Americans have not been coming to America in the numbers of Hispanic immigrants and African Americans, there have been fewer instances in which they have been used in medical trials and unfairly compensated. In addition, as the wave of migration of Asians to the United States has happened more recently, the history of this group in the United States is relatively young. As a result, there have not been governmental efforts to address health disparities between Asian Americans and the general populations like there have been with other groups like Hispanic Americans, African Americans, and Native Americans.

Asian Americans are the fastest-growing major racial or ethnic group in the United States according to a Pew Research Center analysis of U.S. Census Bureau data. As this race has become more of an integral part of US population more initiatives have been implemented such to address health needs specifically such the Initiative on Race implemented by President Clinton to eliminate health disparities in and among all racial and ethnic groups. Further research within the past 20 years has shown that Asian Americans are at high risk for hepatitis B, liver cancer, tuberculosis, and lung cancer, among other conditions. The Asian American cancer burden is unique as they are the only racial/ethnic population to experience cancer as the leading cause of death and it has unusual aspects such as experiencing proportionally more cancers of infectious origin, such as human papillomavirus‐induced cervical cancer, hepatitis B virus‐induced liver cancer, and stomach cancer, than any other racial/ethnic population and, at the same time, experiencing an increasing number of cancers associated with "Westernization." Similarly, Asian Americans have a heightened risk of type 2 diabetes as its presence makes up 21% of the Asian American population, twice as high as non-Hispanic whites. Finally, cardiovascular disease, the leading cause of death for all Americans, continues to disproportionally affect the Asian Americans who are disadvantageous in society due to various social determinants. These social determinants leading to health disparity include but not limit to lack of language proficiency, health illiteracy due to lower educational attainment, racial discrimination, economic instability and poor community engagement.

=== Maternal and child health ===
In 2002, it was reported that Asian American births accounted for 5.2% of the births in the United States. One study that compared births among Indian Americans and non-Hispanic white Americans revealed that Indian Americans had significantly lower birth weights than did non-Hispanic white Americans. It was also revealed that Indian American mothers and non-Hispanic white American mothers had similar rates of adequate prenatal care. In addition, when the infant mortality rates were compared between the groups, Asian Americans (excluding Pacific Islanders) had a lower rate than did non-Hispanic white Americans. However, Pacific Islanders had an infant mortality rate that was much higher than did the Asian Americans and the non-Hispanic white Americans. Similarly, Asian Americans had a maternal mortality rate that was lower than that of non-Hispanic whites as well as the national average in the United States.

The demographic overview of Asian Americans shows that the birth rate for Asian American and Pacific Islander women is higher than for all other groups except Hispanic women, those mothers tend to be older on average than mothers of other races with the highest rate of births occurring among women aged 30–34 years, older than for other groups, and teen birth rates are overall lower for this population.

One of the main concerns remains the disparity of prenatal care utilization among Asian American women in communities across the United States and research has shown that subgroups of Asian American mothers are less likely than others to receive early and adequate prenatal care. According to HealthIndicators.gov, explaining the data, "APNCU is a measure of prenatal care utilization that combines the month of pregnancy prenatal care begun with the number of prenatal visits. Rates can be classified as "intensive use," "adequate," "intermediate," or "less than adequate." For this measure, adequate prenatal care is defined as a score of either "adequate" or "intensive use.""

On a more positive note, the rate of mortality for Asian American and Pacific Islander babies is 4.78 per 1,000 live births, lower than what is found in the general population.

=== Mental health ===
There are not many studies concerning mental health outcomes among Asian Americans. Mental health in this group is reported to be relatively better than that of the general population. The Chinese American Psychiatric Epidemiological Study (CAPES) was commissioned to determine the incidence of mental health problems in the DSM III in Chinese American populations. The results of the study showed that roughly 4.9% of the population of Chinese Americans experienced depression this compares to 17.1% of White Americans were classified as clinically depressed. However, this may not be entirely indicative of the true trends with respect to mental health in the population of Asian Americans. According to the NGO Mental Health in America, 5.4% of Americans identify as Asian American, and 13% of this population reported having a diagnosable mental illness in the past year. This proportion of Asian Americans experiencing depression is lower than that of non-Hispanic white Americans. This may be a result of underreporting or lack of diagnoses in the Asian American community due to cultural stigmas surrounding mental health.

Further the cultural factors play an important role in assessing the statistics related to mental health in this population. Mental illness is highly stigmatized in many Asian cultures, so symptoms are likely underreported. Asian Americans thus express more somatic symptoms than their European American counterparts when under mental or emotional distress. Because of this kind of cultural variation in mental disorders and expression of symptoms, lack of health care access, and an underutilization of mental health resources, researchers have difficulty obtaining accurate statistics about Asian American mental health

Further, many Asian Americans are prone to the same conflicts from language barriers a different language and intergenerational conflicts. For instance, a varying English proficiency among immigrant Asian parents can be a source of conflict between parents and children. One study shows that in immigrant Chinese families, the level of English proficiency in the parental generation correlates with indicators of child and adolescent psychological well-being.

== White Americans ==
It has been hypothesized that racism in the US may also affect the health of White Americans. While they have better health than historically oppressed groups, the health of White Americans is poorer than that of Whites in other wealthy countries. This line of argument posits that racism in Whites towards other ethnic groups has caused White opposition towards social welfare programs, the implementation of which would also benefit a large number of White Americans. Internalized feelings of racial superiority could have a role in the rising number of deaths of despair among low-income Whites.

The opioid epidemic in the United States is overwhelmingly white, sparing African-American and Latino communities because doctors unconsciously prescribe narcotics more cautiously to their non-white patients. "Racial stereotyping is having a protective effect on non-white populations," according to Dr. Andrew Kolodny, the co-director of the Opioid Policy Research Collaborative at Brandeis.

== Vaccination ==
In 2020, Moderna slowed enrollment in its COVID-19 vaccine testing for the purpose of increasing representation of minorities. In Phase 1a, vaccination eligibility was extended solely to public health workers and residents of long-term care facilities. 60% of public health workers were white. 75% of long-term care facility residents were white. Prior to the September 2020 announcement, 20% of enrollees were Hispanic/Latino and 7% were black. At Pfizer, 25% of enrollees were Hispanic or nonwhite, including 8% who were black. A government representative cited "historical abuse", "present racial injustices and health care disparities", and "recent social unrest (and) the faltering economy" as factors impeding recruitment of blacks.

== Reproductive health ==
In the United States, reproductive health disparities exist between white and minority women. Historical abuses and experimentation on Black women by medical professionals has led to greater distrust of the medical community. Additionally, current racial biases held by medical personnel affect medical care of Black and minority women. Compared to white women, the rate of HIV infection is disproportionately high in Black and Hispanic women. These groups account for 75% of infection among women. There is also a gap in contraceptive use between white and Black women. These disparities are partly due to lack of health insurance and financial costs. Comprehensive gynecological care can also help reduce the rates of HIV in minority women and increase contraceptive use. The lack of reproductive health is a contributing factor in higher rates of maternal mortality in the United States among minority women, especially among Black women. Black women are 3.3 times more likely than white women to die from pregnancy-related causes. This is partly due to lack of insurance before pregnancy and higher rates of chronic conditions, such as obesity and diabetes. Furthermore, there are disparities in the use and success of ART among racial and socio-economic groups given the high costs, limited access, and varied utilization. A review of all U.S. studies that considered race and ethnicity when reporting success rates for ART, found white women consistently had the highest success rates, followed by Hispanic and Asian women, and African American women. An African American women does not receive the same treatment as a white women due to the age they were diagnosed at, the household income, and the specific treatment facility.

In the US women of different racial and ethnic backgrounds experience unequal access to reproductive healthcare and face different health outcomes. Historically black women were subjected to unethical medical practices and experience, limitation, which has contributed to the lasting mistrust in the healthcare system. Today that mistrust is often reinforced by experiences of bias and unequal treatment in healthcare settings. Health data shows that Black and Hispanic women continue to be affected by HIV. In 2022, Black women accounted for 50% and Hispanic/Latina females for 20% of new HIV diagnoses among people assigned female sex at birth, so together they represented about 70% of new HIV diagnoses in this population despite making up a minority of the U.S. female population. Access to contraception also varies, with black women using contraceptives at lower rates than white women; often due to financial barriers, gaps in insurance, or limited access to healthcare providers. National survey data show, for instance, that current use of contraception is higher among non-Hispanic white women than among non-Hispanic Black and Hispanic women.

There are also major differences in maternal health outcomes. Black women are over three times more likely than white women to die from pregnancy related causes, and this is still true for Black women with higher levels of education and income. Analyses of national mortality data estimate pregnancy-related mortality ratios of around 40 deaths per 100,000 live births for non-hispanic Black women, compared with about 12 deaths per 100,000 for non-Hispanic white women. Chronic conditions like obesity and diabetes, along with unequal treatment, contribute to these disparities. Assisted reproductive technologies also show unequal outcomes. White women generally have the highest success rates, while Black women tend to have the lowest; often due to differences in access, diagnosis timing, and treatment options.

=== Health Care Services for women of color ===
Women of color disproportionately face additional challenges in accessing quality health care due to socioeconomic disparities and social determining factors of health. To reduce these disparities, health centers provide accessible health services for women, including women of color. Recognizing the disproportionate challenges women of color face in accessing quality health care, community health centers (CHCs) aim to provide targeted, accessible services that address these disparities. By integrating into communities and working alongside hospitals and public health departments, CHCs play a key role in bridge the gaps in care by embedding themselves within communities to coordinate efforts with hospitals and public health departments to provide comprehensive, culturally responsive care that addresses the complex needs of underserved populations. However, systemic challenges, such as limited funding and inconsistent integration with broader healthcare networks, continue to hinder CHCs for women of color.

These funding limitations and policy gaps create significant barriers for women of color seeking consistent care. A study conducted at Planned Parenthood health centers in Louisiana and Kentucky highlights how insurance instability and lack of regular sources of care exacerbate these challenges, particularly in states that do not have expanded medicaid under the ACA. The study underscores the critical role of health centers in bridging these gaps, but also point out the need for more robust governmental support to enhance Medicaid access and strengthen safety-net services. The study began in March 2016 and lasted until May 2017 and surveyed 725 women seeking health services at two Planned Parenthood health centers- one in Louisiana and one in Kentucky- for their varying levels of access to care, including insurance stability and access to a regular source of care (RSOC). This study records that "more than 60% of women attending these health centers did not have a RSOC and nearly 40% experienced instability in insurance". The most frequent reasons for attending these health centers were getting appointments quicker, acquiring confidential services, the low cost of services, and accessing services that are otherwise difficult to get because of insurance gaps, especially in states such as Louisiana that failed to expand Medicaid under the ACA.

Federal policies like the ACA have expanded Medicaid coverage and funding for CHCs, but variability in state-level implementation and funding cuts have created challenges. For instance, low reimbursement rates and previous state restrictions on Medicaid provisions severely limited the expansion of ACA nationwide. With the expansion of the ACA, some states included other provisions. More specifically, cost-sharing requirements or lock-out rules reduced Medicaid eligibility and increased the number of participants with non-continuous coverage. Governmental policies that cause Medicaid disruptions, such as work requirements for Medicaid eligibility, increase barriers to access for care in CHCs. Variability in state funding, inflexible federal mandates and political vulnerability to funding cuts, disproportionately affect women of color, who are more likely to rely on CHCs for affordable and accessible care. These barriers compound existing disparities, limiting their ability to access continuous coverage and essential services, and therefore, demonstrating the need for CHCs to develop tailored solutions that address women of color in healthcare.

CHCs have shown potential in addressing localized healthcare disparities by tailoring services to the community's cultural and economic realities. For instance, The Women's Cancer Resource Center (WCRC), founded in 1986, provides support services and workshops that are language concordant and culturally-sensitive. The WCRC offers various types of emotional services, one of which is designed for the African American population and the other to the Latinx population. African Americans disproportionately face low quality of care and are more likely to be diagnosed with cancer at a younger age and later stage. Sister to Sister is a support group for African American women to empower them with accessible financial and health educational resources and wellness workshops while providing them with a safe and supportive space. In addition, these free services that exist in immigrant communities can be entirely inaccessible. Children in immigrant families (CIF) are more likely to experience adverse social determinants of health, suboptimal health service utilization, and increased rates of chronic illness compared to children in non-immigrant families due to disproportionate rates of parental unemployment and underemployment, limited English proficiency (LEP), and limited access and participation in public safety net programs that exist among immigrant communities. Language barriers and high rates of low health literacy reduces the utilization of these services because these communities struggle to navigate them. To meet the needs of the Latinx community, the Latina Services provides cancer services, emotional support, and health educational resources that are accessible, culturally sensitive, and language concordant to all patients who speak Spanish. Women Health Centers like the WCRC work to make health services accessible to all women, including women of color and those with cultural and language barriers.

Women of color often face additional challenges when it comes to getting consistent, quality health care. These challenges can include limited insurance, lower income, language barriers, and fewer healthcare providers in their communities. Community Health Centers (CHCs) work to help fill these gaps by offering affordable, culturally sensitive care. They often partner with hospitals and public health organizations to serve underserved areas, but they still face obstacles like limited funding and inconsistent policy support.

A study done at Planned Parenthood health centers in Kentucky and Louisiana found that many women—especially those without Medicaid—lacked a regular source of care. Over 60% of women surveyed said they didn't have a regular place to go for healthcare, and nearly 40% reported problems with maintaining insurance coverage. Many turned to health centers because they could get faster, more affordable, or confidential services that were otherwise hard to access.

Although the Affordable Care Act helped expand Medicaid in some states, others opted out or added barriers like work requirements, which has made it harder for many people—especially women of color—to get continuous coverage. These policy decisions have a big impact on CHCs, which rely on stable funding and Medicaid reimbursements to operate.

Some CHCs have started creating programs tailored to the specific cultural needs of the communities they serve. For example, the Women's Cancer Resource Center offers support groups specifically for African American and Latinx women that are language-accessible and culturally aware. These programs help address deeper challenges in healthcare, such as low health literacy, language barriers, and a general lack of trust in the system.

== Health care workers ==
=== Minority representation in medicine ===
In 2015, African Americans, Native Americans, and Hispanics made up 31% of the U.S. population, but only 15% of medical school applicants, 12% of medical school graduates, and 6% of practicing physicians. Studies have shown that having a diverse physician workforce is important because minority students are more likely to provide health services to underserved communities. A 2012 study done in California found that physicians from minority backgrounds were more likely to practice in underserved or areas of health shortages than their white counterparts, no matter what their specialty. When looking more into the study, it was discovered that doctors from minority backgrounds were more likely to work in underserved areas because many of them grew up in those same underserved communities and saw many of the health disparities that existed. As a result, they looked at working in underserved communities to give back.

Other research has also shown that representation of minorities in the healthcare workforce has many positive influences such as healthcare access for underserved demographics, better cultural effectiveness between healthcare providers, and new medical research that includes all individuals of the population.

Research shows that doctors from minority backgrounds are more likely to work in underserved communities, often because they come from those areas themselves and want to give back. These physicians understand the cultural, social, and economic barriers their patients face, which can lead to better care and stronger patient-provider relationships.

More diversity in healthcare also improves access for marginalized groups, strengthens cultural understanding, and helps make medical research more inclusive of the entire population.

=== Trends in admission ===
The number of students from underrepresented backgrounds applying to professional medical schools has increased, but this increase has not been enough to keep up with the rapidly increasing minority population. Overall, the numbers of underrepresented minority medical school students such as African Americans, Hispanics, and American Indians, or Alaska Natives enrollees increased slightly. However, the only group that showed a statistically significant increase in representation was Hispanic females. HealthLeaders's Chris Cheney faults a lack of early educational opportunities for minority groups which is contributing to the low numbers of minorities pursuing careers in the health care field.

Flores and Combs (2013) detail the barriers at the organizational level when it comes to recruiting minority applicants. Organizations, such as nursing schools, tend to operate on "normative actions." As a result, societal stereotypes became so instilled within the culture of organizations that it becomes difficult to change the climate of the organization. For long as history has existed, stereotypes of minorities have placed their roots into society and many still that hold true today. Because of this, many organizations tend to still display varying levels of both intentional and unintentional biases toward minorities (Flores & Combs, 2013). For example, it explores the field of nursing. Nursing is one of the many healthcare careers where acceptance into school is very competitive. In the year 2006, minority applicants had an only 40% chance of being accepted into nursing school compared to over 85% of white applicants. Acceptance rates for minority applications have improved only slightly since 2006.

Data from the American Medical Association indicates that the combined percentage of minority groups entering medical school such as African Americans, Native Americans, Latino backgrounds make up 31%. However, out this 31% about 15% are current medical school applicants, 12% become medical school graduates, while only 6% become practicing physicians, and it unclear what happened to the other 6%.

One of the key issues is that the medical field is still struggling to reflect the diversity of the country. Even though applications from underrepresented groups—like Black, Hispanic, and Native American students—have gone up over the years, they still haven't caught up to the overall population growth. A big part of the problem is that many of these students don't get access to the same early educational opportunities as their white peers, which puts them at a disadvantage from the start.

Biases—both intentional and unintentional—within admissions systems make things worse. Long-standing stereotypes about people of color still show up in school and workplace policies, whether it's obvious or not. For instance, studies have shown that minority applicants to competitive healthcare programs like nursing face lower acceptance rates than white applicants, and the gap hasn't narrowed much over time.

Even when students from underrepresented groups enter medical school, not all of them make it through the entire pipeline. For example, while around 31% of incoming med students may be from minority backgrounds, far fewer go on to graduate and become practicing doctors.

== Criticisms ==
Some scholars have argued for a genetic understanding of racial health disparities in the United States, suggesting that certain genes predispose individuals to specific diseases. However, the U.S. Census Bureau's recognition of race as a social and not biological category necessitates a social understanding of the causes of health disparities. Additionally, the restricted options for "race" and "ethnicity" in Census Bureau data complicates the results of their findings.

This issue is illustrated with the example of those who identify themselves as Hispanic/Latino, typically a mix of White, American Indian and African ancestry. Although some studies include this as a "race", many such as the U.S. Census do not, forcing members of this group to choose between identifying themselves as one of the listed racial categories, even if they do not personally identify with it. Additionally, individuals who identify as biracial or multiracial must choose one category to identify with, limiting the ability of many Americans to select a census category that they actually identify with. The inability of many individuals to fully identify with one census category indicates the necessity of cultural, historical, and socio-economic explanations of health disparities rather than a biological one.

Census groupings have also been criticized for their broadness. "Race" and "ethnicity" are used in many different ways in the United States, and the lack of subgroups in Census categories fails to account for the diversity of people identifying with each group. Every group on the Census includes people who identify with a number of unrepresented racial and ethnic sub-categories, but the Hispanic/Latino ethnicity group and Asian racial group have been particularly criticized for this lack of specificity.

Some researchers have pushed for a genetic explanation when it comes to racial health disparities—basically suggesting that certain groups are more prone to specific diseases because of their DNA. But this view has been widely challenged. The U.S. Census Bureau itself treats race as a social construct, not a biological one, and most public health experts agree that the root causes of health disparities are tied more to social, economic, and environmental conditions than to genetics.

The oversimplification of race and ethnicity in Census data has been criticized as both misrepresenting mixed race people and lumping together disparate groups (e.g. lumping together near east and far east Asians). This oversimplification makes it harder to get accurate, meaningful data on health outcomes.

== See also ==
- Race and health
- National Institute on Minority Health and Health Disparities
- Minority stress § Health outcomes among African Americans
- Black maternal mortality in the United States
- Medical deserts in the United States
- Modern social statistics of Native Americans § Health standards
- Obesity in the United States § Race
- Environmental racism
- Environmental racism in the United States
- Weathering hypothesis
- Food desert
- Ghetto tax
- Post Traumatic Slave Syndrome
- Racial biases in medical decision-making tools
- Race and crime in the United States
- Racial disparities in the COVID-19 pandemic in the United States
