= Chandra Ford =

American public health academic

Chandra L. Ford
- Education: University of North Carolina at Chapel Hill; Pennsylvania State University University of Pittsburgh
- Scientific career
- Workplaces: Columbia University Mailman School of Public Health; University of California, Los Angeles
- Thesis: Perceived racism, neighborhood characteristics and human immunodeficiency virus (HIV) testing behaviors among African American community residents and sexually transmitted disease (STD) clinic patients (2005)

Chandra L. Ford is an American public health academic who is Professor of Community Health Sciences at the University of California, Los Angeles. She serves as Founding Director at the Center for the Study of Racism, Social Justice & Health. Her research considers relationships between racism and health outcomes.

== Early life and education ==
Ford completed her bachelor's degree in nutrition at Pennsylvania State University. She moved to the University of Pittsburgh for her graduate studies, where she completed a master's degree in library and information science and a second course in public health at the University of Pittsburgh. She has said that she became interested in health disparities because her family had a history in social justice and civil rights. Ford earned her doctoral degree at the University of North Carolina at Chapel Hill, where she studied health behaviour. She was a W. K. Kellogg Foundation scholar at the Columbia University Mailman School of Public Health. Her research considered the reasons that HIV was so prevalent amongst African American communities. During her fellowship she identified that African American people who were aware of racism were more proactive in seeking HIV testing and healthcare support than those who were unaware. Similarly, African American people who were seen by Black clinicians were more likely to have an HIV test than those seen by non-Black clinicians. She devised a series of outreach programmes for high-risk populations, which looked to communicate the risks of HIV and importance of early diagnosis.

== Research and career ==
Ford studies health equity and the social determinants of health. She has studied the influence of racism on healthcare and policy in the United States, recognising that it is a root cause of health inequity. Her research combines public health research with critical race theory; so-called the public health critical race praxis. In particular, her research emphasises that race is a social construct; and she is critical of scientists and physicians who reinforce the idea that race is a biological attribute and the cause of health outcomes.

In 2016 Ford was appointed to the National Academy of Medicine Committee on Community-based Solutions to Promote Health Equity. She serves on the American Public Health Association Anti-Racism Collaborative. She is the founding Director of the University of California, Los Angeles Center for the Study of Racism, Social Justice and Health. The center, founded in 2017, investigates the health implications of racism for diverse populations. It provides explicit examples on how those working in public health can tackle racism, including naming racism explicitly, learning how to recognise bias, building community capacity, collecting data and prioritising equity.

Ford and her colleague Gilbert C. Gee were awarded the 2019 Paul Cornely Award for their work on how health is affected by racism.

During the COVID-19 pandemic, Ford investigated the reasons that Black people were overrepresented amongst coronavirus disease deaths. She argued that communities of colour were more likely to live near the environmental hazards and pollutants, making them more likely to develop a severe form of coronavirus disease, and they were less likely to have access to affordable healthcare. Ford called for more organising and activism to support communities of colour who have suffered from historical medical injustice. In mid-May, Ford was critical of the decision for states to reopen from the COVID-19 lockdowns, saying that the reopening would disproportionately impact people of colour and immigrants. She called for care to be taken to ensure that the communities who were suffering most from coronavirus disease did not become subject to more policing and arrest.

== Selected publications ==
- Gee, Gilbert C.; Ford, Chandra L. (2011). "Structural Racism and Health Inequities: Old Issues, New Directions". Du Bois Review: Social Science Research on Race. 8 (1): 115–132. doi:10.1017/S1742058X11000130. ISSN 1742-058X. PMC 4306458. PMID 25632292.
- Ford, Chandra L.; Airhihenbuwa, Collins O. (2010-10-01). "The public health critical race methodology: Praxis for antiracism research". Social Science & Medicine. 71 (8): 1390–1398. doi:10.1016/j.socscimed.2010.07.030. ISSN 0277-9536. PMID 20822840.

=== Books ===
- Racism: Science & tools for the public health professional. Ford, Chandra L., Griffith, Derek. M., Bruce, Marino A. (Marino Anton), Gilbert, Keon L. Washington, DC. 2019. ISBN 978-0-87553-303-2. OCLC 1119584320.
- Ford, Chandra L. Airhihenbuwa, Collins O. (2010). "Critical Race Theory, Race Equity, and Public Health: Toward Antiracism Praxis". American Journal of Public Health. 100 (Suppl 1). American Public Health Association: S30-5. doi:10.2105/AJPH.2009.171058. OCLC 809386168. PMC 2837428. PMID 20147679.
