= Debra Umberson =

American sociologist

Academic background
- Education: BA, MSW, University of Arkansas at Little Rock; MA, PhD, sociology, 1985, Vanderbilt University
- Thesis: Parenthood and social integration: implications for psychological well-being and risk-taking behaviors (1985)

Debra J. Umberson is an American sociologist. She is a professor of sociology at the University of Texas at Austin and director of the Population Research Center.

== Early life and education ==
Umberson earned her Bachelor of Arts degree and MSW at the University of Arkansas at Little Rock and her Master's degree and PhD from Vanderbilt University.

== Career ==
Upon receiving her PhD, Umberson accepted a faculty appointment in sociology at the University of Texas at Austin in 1985. Within four years as an assistant professor, she received tenure and promotion to associate professor and in another four years was promoted to Full Professor. While serving in this role, Umberson chaired the Department of Sociology at the University of Texas from 2000 to 2006 and published her first book Death of a Parent: Transition to a New Adult Identity in 2003 through the Cambridge University Press. Following the books publication, she was appointed Editor of the Journal of Health and Social Behavior and awarded the Matilda White Riley Distinguished Scholar Award from the ASA Section on Aging and the Life Course. In the same year, Umberson led a study finding a correlation between childhood stress and weight gain in older women.

In recognition of Umberson's "substantial contributions in theory and/or research to the sociology of mental health," she was the recipient of the Leonard Pearlin Award from the American Sociological Association Sociology of Mental Health Section. By January 2019, she was appointed the co-director of the Texas Aging and Longevity Center to study baby boomers. She was also elected chair of Behavioral and Social Sciences Section of the Gerontological Society of America. During the COVID-19 pandemic in North America, Umberson was the recipient of the 2020 Leo G. Reeder Award from the ASA Medical Sociology section for "displaying an extended trajectory of productivity that has contributed to theory and research in medical sociology, along with teaching, mentoring, and service to the medical sociology community." She also received the 2020 Distinguished Career Award from the Family Section of the American Sociological Association.

== Selected publications ==
- Death of a Parent: Transition to a New Adult Identity (2003)
