= Michael Hughes (sociologist) =

Sociologist and academic (born 1944)

- Occupations: Sociologist and academic

Academic background
- Education: BA., Sociology; MA., Sociology; PhD., Sociology
- Alma mater: University of Alabama; Vanderbilt University

Academic work
- Institutions: Virginia Polytechnic Institute and State University

Michael Hughes (born Michael Dalziel Hughes) is a sociologist and academic. He is professor emeritus of Sociology at Virginia Tech.

Hughes' research focuses on mental health and race, exploring the relation between social factors, individual experiences, racial attitudes, and cultural influences. He is the author of numerous research articles and three books including Sociology: The Core, and Inside Sociology. Among other honors, he was added to the Roll of Honor by the Southern Sociological Society in 2020. As of September 2023, his work has received more than 48,000 citations.

Hughes was the President of the Southern Sociological Society (2004–2005). He was also Editor of the Journal of Health and Social Behavior.

== Education and early life ==
Born in Washington, D.C. in 1944, Hughes is the son of Colonel Aquilla B. Hughes Jr. (1915–1994), who was a B17 bomber pilot in WW-II and a 1940 graduate of the United States Military Academy at West Point, and Constance Dalziel Hughes (1917–2013). In 1967, he obtained a B.A. in sociology from the University of Alabama, followed by an M.A. from the same university in 1971. He later earned a Ph.D. in sociology from Vanderbilt University in 1979.

== Career ==
Hughes began his career serving as an instructor of sociology at the University of North Alabama (1971–1973). Following graduate school at Vanderbilt (1973–1979) where he worked under Walter R. Gove, he joined the Sociology Department at Virginia Tech as an assistant professor. He was promoted to associate professor in 1985, and became Professor of Sociology in 1997. He served as a Research Fellow at the University of Michigan (1992–1994). Following retirement in 2021, he has been professor emeritus of Sociology.

== Research ==
Hughes' research focused on the intersection of sociology and race, investigating various aspects of well-being, racial identity, mental health, racial attitudes and the impact of mass violence on psychological health.

=== Works ===
In his first book, Overcrowding in the Household, co-authored with Walter R. Gove, Hughes explored the factors linked to household overcrowding and its potential impact on individuals through an analysis of subjective and objective crowding concepts. Mark Baldassare in his review wrote, "This book is likely to stimulate much-needed theorizing and systematic research."

Hughes authored Sociology: The Core and Inside Sociology, which provide analyses of primary sociological principles and encompass major discussions and findings in the field spanning several years.

=== Social integration and mental health ===
At Virginia Tech, Hughes continued his graduate research on household crowding and solitary living's mental health impact, finding that living alone doesn't inherently lead to psychological issues but may improve mental health, while crowding in households correlated with poor mental health and strained relationships.

From 1992 to 1994, Hughes was a co-author on studies that came out of the National Comorbidity Survey (NCS) headed by Ronald C. Kessler then at the University of Michigan. One of the highly cited studies in this project revealed 50% reported one-lifetime disorder in the US population, with women prone to anxiety and affective disorders, men to drug/alcohol and anti-social personality disorders. In other studies, he explored the impact of sexual orientation on mental health, and noted older women's higher 12-month MDE rates than men, contributing to elevated depression among women aged 45–54. In another NCS collaboration, he examined the age of onset of PTSD and the conditional probabilities of PTSD across traumas.

=== Race, racial identity, and psychological well-being ===
Hughes explored the connection between race and well-being, addressing the paradox of African Americans' relatively good mental health despite facing more stressors and adverse social conditions. Collaborating with K. Jill Kiecolt and Verna M. Keith, he linked a positive racial identity to higher self-esteem, mastery, and lower depression among African Americans, shedding light on their mental health advantage over whites.

Hughes studied racial identity, exploring its factors, including micro social relations, parental messages, and socioeconomic factors. His early work found African Americans had lower quality of life than whites from 1972 to 1996, with consistent racial disparities across socioeconomic statuses. He also studied how financial stress affects African Americans' mental well-being, and emphasized the positive impact of racial identity on self-esteem and psychological well-being. He also studied the impact of skin color on socioeconomic status and spousal status among black Americans.

=== Racial attitudes ===
Hughes focused on White peoples' racial attitudes, highlighting a gap between their support for equality principles and resistance to specific policies addressing racial inequities. He identified racial resentment driving resistance, with gender disparities in racial attitudes primarily in racial policy opinions shaped by shared group position. His Socius study challenged the idea that racial resentment and racial policy attitudes are the same construct, while his work on a 50-year Deep South survey revealed declining racial stereotypes and segregation support among young white adults, aligning with Herbert Blumer's perspective on evolving prejudice to maintain dominant group advantage.

=== Mass violence and mental health ===
Hughes' research on PTSD symptoms following mass shootings includes a study conducted after the 2007 Virginia Tech campus shooting. The study revealed that 15.4% of surveyed students exhibited probable PTSD symptoms three to four months after the event. He participated in other studies showing that posttraumatic stress symptom severity indirectly intensified grief one year later, and that trauma-exposed individuals exhibited reckless behavior due to worldview changes.

== Awards and honors ==
- 2004 – President, Southern Sociological Society
- 2020 – Roll of Honor, Southern Sociological Society

== Bibliography ==
=== Books ===
- Overcrowding in the household (1983) ISBN 9780122940606
- Sociology the core (2002) ISBN 9780071130523
- Inside Sociology (2005) ISBN 9780073528045

=== Selected articles ===
- Gove, W. R., Hughes, M., & Style, C. B. (1983). Does marriage have positive effects on the psychological well-being of the individual?. Journal of health and social behavior, 122–131.
- Hughes, M., & Demo, D. H. (1989). Self-perceptions of Black Americans: Self-esteem and personal efficacy. American Journal of Sociology, 95(1), 132–159.
- Demo, D. H., & Hughes, M. (1990). Socialization and racial identity among Black Americans. Social psychology quarterly, 364–374.
- Hughes, M., & Hertel, B. R. (1990). The significance of color remains: A study of life chances, mate selection, and ethnic consciousness among Black Americans. Social forces, 68(4), 1105–1120.
- Kessler, R. C., McGonagle, K. A., Zhao, S., Nelson, C. B., Hughes, M., Eshleman, S., & Kendler, K. S. (1994). Lifetime and 12-month prevalence of DSM-III-R psychiatric disorders in the United States: results from the National Comorbidity Survey. Archives of general psychiatry, 51(1), 8–19.
- Kessler, R. C., McGonagle, K. A., Nelson, C. B., Hughes, M., Swartz, M., & Blazer, D. G. (1994). Sex and depression in the National Comorbidity Survey. II: Cohort effects. Journal of affective disorders, 30(1), 15–26.
- Kessler, R. C., Sonnega, A., Bromet, E., Hughes, M., & Nelson, C. B. (1995). Posttraumatic stress disorder in the National Comorbidity Survey. Archives of general psychiatry, 52(12), 1048–1060.
- Hughes, M., & Thomas, M. E. (1998). The continuing significance of race revisited: A study of race, class, and quality of life in America, 1972 to 1996. American Sociological Review, 785–795.
- Gilman, S. E., Cochran, S. D., Mays, V. M., Hughes, M., Ostrow, D., & Kessler, R. C. (2001). Risk of psychiatric disorders among individuals reporting same-sex sexual partners in the National Comorbidity Survey. American journal of public health, 91(6), 933.
- Hughes, M., Brymer, M., Chiu, W. T., Fairbank, J. A., Jones, R. T., Pynoos, R. S., & Kessler, R. C. (2011). Posttraumatic stress among students after the shootings at Virginia Tech. Psychological Trauma: Theory, Research, Practice, and Policy, 3(4), 403.
- Hughes, M., Kiecolt, K. J., & Keith, V. M. (2014). How racial identity moderates the impact of financial stress on mental health among African Americans. Society and Mental Health, 4(1), 38–54.
- Hughes, M., Kiecolt, K. J., Keith, V. M., & Demo, D. H. (2015). Racial identity and well-being among African Americans. Social Psychology Quarterly, 78(1), 25–48.
- Hughes, M., Tuch, S. A., McCallum, D. M., Smith, G. P., Lo, C. C., McKnight, U., & Fording, R. C. (2023). Racial Attitudes in the Deep South: Persistence and Change at the University of Alabama, 1963–2013. Sociological Inquiry.
