= Journal of Health and Social Behavior =

- Discipline: Medical sociology
- Language: English
- Edited by: Deborah Carr

Publication details
- Former names: Journal of Health and Human Behavior
- History: 1960-present
- Publisher: Sage Publishing on behalf of the American Sociological Association (United States)
- Frequency: Quarterly
- Impact factor: 3.6 (2024)

Standard abbreviations
- ISO 4: J. Health Soc. Behav.

Indexing
- CODEN: JHSBA5
- ISSN: 0022-1465 (print); 2150-6000 (web)
- LCCN: 65003408
- JSTOR: 00221465
- OCLC no.: 1695738

Links
- Journal homepage; Online access; Online archive

The Journal of Health and Social Behavior is a quarterly peer-reviewed academic journal published by Sage Publishing on behalf of the American Sociological Association. It covers the application of sociological concepts and methods to the understanding of health and illness and the organization of medicine and health care. The editor-in-chief is Deborah Carr (Boston University). Previous editors-in-chief include: Amy Burdette (Florida State University), Richard M. Carpiano (University of California, Riverside), Brian C. Kelly (Purdue University), Gilbert Gee (University of California, Los Angeles), Debra Umberson (University of Texas at Austin), Eliza Pavalko (Indiana University) and Michael Hughes.

== Abstracting and indexing ==
The journal is abstracted and indexed in AgeLine, Applied Social Science Index and Abstracts, Education Resources Information Center, MEDLINE/PubMed, PsycINFO, Science Citation Index, Scopus, and Social Sciences Citation Index.
