= Gilbert Gee =

Professor at the University of California, USA

- Born: Gilbert Chee-Leung Gee
- Education: Oberlin College; Johns Hopkins University
- Known for: Health equity Race and health
- Awards: National Institutes of Health Group Merit Award (2008)
- Scientific career
- Fields: Public health
- Institutions: University of California, Los Angeles
- Thesis: More than only skin deep: Institutional and individual racial discrimination and the health status of Chinese-Americans (1998)
- Doctoral advisor: Thomas A. LaVeist

Gilbert C. Gee is a professor in the Department of Community Health Sciences in the Fielding School of Public Health at the University of California, Los Angeles. He is known for researching the effects of racial discrimination on mental and physical health. He was appointed editor-in-chief of the Journal of Health and Social Behavior in 2013. Gee and his colleague Chandra Ford were awarded the 2019 Paul Cornely Award for their work on how health is affected by racism.
