= Obstacles to receiving mental health services among African American youth =

Obstacles to receiving mental health services among African American youth have been associated with stigma and shame, child-related factors, treatment affordability, availability, and accessibility, clinician and therapeutic factors, the school system, religion/spirituality, and social networks. When examining the prevalence rates of African American youth that have experienced cognitive and behavioral challenges, the underutilization of mental health services is startling. The National Comorbidity Survey-Adolescent Supplement revealed that 46.8% of African Americans under 18-years-old may have a mental health disorder. Additionally, African American children between the ages of five- and twelve-years old commit suicide at approximately double the rate of their White counterparts. Furthermore, the data from the Youth Risk Behavior Surveillance System (YRBSS) showed that Black students commit suicide at higher rates than White students. With all this information in mind, only three-quarters of African American children receive mental health care. 76.5% of African American youth from the ages of six to seventeen have mental health issues that need help, but their needs are not met. 50% to 75% of urban community-dwelling Black children and adolescents do not receive mental health care. A study showed that African American youth experiencing a major depressive episode are more unlikely to seek aid or speak to anyone about how they feel. 13% to 52% of African American child and adolescents who do not receive the mental health care that they need are at higher risk for detrimental health outcomes; hence, the importance of identifying the obstacles that may prevent unaddressed mental health service needs.

== Stigma and shame ==
It is common for African American youth to look to their families and friends for support; however, some youth refrained from speaking to those close to them due to, “fearing that friends would laugh, joke, or tease them” (Lindsey et al., 2006, p. 53), or that family members might “feel offended that they weren't able to help or that they were a second choice” (Lindsey et al., 2013, p. 113). Youth may also not want to engage in therapy when their families or friends express negative thoughts or beliefs about the effectiveness of therapy “people can grow out of whatever mental health issues they think they may have” (Samuel, 2015, p. 39).

Stigma and shame were obstacles for seeking mental health services in 85% of African American youth that were formerly in juvenile detentions. In another study, shame, embarrassment, and exclusion were considered barriers to mental health. Stigma and shame is also felt by the mother of African American youth who endorsement the item “If I took my child to a professional for help with emotional or behavioral problems, I think people in my community would find out” (Murry et al., 2011, p. 1124). Similarly, 16% of Black mothers reported the fear of judgment (e.g., what people might think about their child receiving mental/behavioral care) prevented them from seeking out mental health services. 56% stated they were fearful of being held responsible for any problems that their child expressed, and 22% stated they feared their neighborhoods/communities would view them in a negative way due to their child's mental/behavioral issues. Parents were concerned that their child might be labeled with stigmatizing terms (e.g. ‘crazy’), the stigma around using and the stigma around people perceiving their child as depressed.

== Child-related factors ==
Black children/adolescents, parents, and care providers reported they did not think their child had any mental health problems or they believed the mental health problems were minor. Care providers refrained from providing parents with mental health resources if they thought the child's concerns were a “phase”. Another obstacle to seeking mental health services was self-reliance. Self-reliance can become detrimental when it reinforces an ideology that Black people are resilient due to the generational trauma they have overcome meaning Black people are able to cope with any mental health concerns they encounter because they could rely on their inner strength.

== Treatment affordability, availability, and accessibility ==
Another obstacle to receiving mental health services may be related to the finances of the family. Parents reported they needed to focus more on their basic/immediate needs before than their child's mental health. 43% of mothers of African American youth believed that mental health services would be too expensive. Relatedly, many therapist providers would not accept Medicaid which became a barrier to seeking mental health services. Transportation and the ability to physically access the location of services were another obstacle for 24% of African American youth with no differences between rural and urban areas. The ability of the health care system to accommodate the youth (e.g., wait times, the availability of convenient appointment times, or the timeliness of a follow-up) presented as an obstacle. The inability to get immediate care due to difficulty accessing their services, inconvenient service locations, and/or inconvenient times presented as another obstacle. Health literacy was an issue for parents, caregivers, and Black adolescents because they were significantly more likely to report they did not know where to go to receive services.

“Black Americans must navigate a maze of obstacles that are built of systematic oppression, institutional inequalities, and structural disparities when seeking mental health services," (Burkett, 2017, p. 814).

== Clinician and therapeutic factors ==
Provider mistrust, therapists not checking in with the client for services, challenges obtaining the correct medication, mental health professionals not replying to the needs of their client, and prior negative experiences with mental health care were obstacles to African American children and adolescents looking for mental health services. When interviewing Black children and adolescents that were currently or formerly receiving mental health care, almost half (48%) questioned the effectiveness of treatment. In a survey of parents and primary caregivers of Black youth they reported that they believed treatment would not help.

Another study revealed that Black parents thought that including mental health professionals in their personal affairs would ‘make everything worse’” (Murry et al., 2011, p. 1123). The fear of the adverse repercussions prevented some Black youth from seeking mental health services and African American mothers specifically had concerns around cultural mistrust. Black adolescents dealing with emotional distress were significantly more likely to be terrified of what a doctor might say compared to White adolescents.

Additionally, studies have shown that the clinical presentation of signs and symptoms varies among African American teenagers. Clinicians underdiagnosed depression in African Americans adolescents due to little education about variance in symptoms of depression that black youth express. Research has shown African American youth are more likely to use stronger language to describe their symptoms of depression when compared to white youth. As a result, clinicians often misunderstand the language used by African American youths to express depression, mistaking it for aggression and irritability instead of recognizing signs of hopelessness and sadness. This contributes to the underdiagnosis of depression among African American adolescents.

== School system ==
In a focus group study of teachers in schools consisting of 96% to 100% of Black students, the following systematic barriers for child mental health service use was identified: “a lack of resources in the school, large class sizes, no zero tolerance for certain behaviors, a lack of parenting classes, too much bureaucracy that impeded change, too many administrators and not enough teachers, and administrators focusing only on schools that are doing well”. Another obstacle to seeking mental health services was the child's home, environment, and/or living situation. Furthermore, parents expressed difficulties in navigating the school system. Parents might assume it was the school's job to solve their child's mental health problems. Parents or primary caregivers sometimes viewed the teachers as part of the problem when wanting to obtain mental health care for their child. Parents tend to not respond to the school when they are contacted about mental health services or their information was incorrect (i.e., their telephone numbers and addresses). When an African American student lived in a foster home, lived with their grandparents, or lived in a homeless shelter it was difficult to receive services because the student was hard to get in contact with.

== Religion/spirituality ==
A coping mechanism to help alleviate mental health issues can be having a relationship with God/a higher power, engaging in prayer, and being involved in spirituality. A study found that strict ideas and values in faith/religious based communities became an obstacle for Black youth from rural, urban, and suburban settings. Adolescent African Americans are less likely to discuss depression with their healthcare providers, citing religious reasons. Studies show black youths often hold beliefs that a higher power protects them during difficult times and, as a result, consider discussing depression with their providers unnecessary.

== Social network ==
Black children and adolescents are unlikely to pursue mental health services if their social networks are helpful and make them feel good. Relatedly, among Black mothers, lack of assistance was obstacle to getting mental health care for their child.
